= List of scientific equations named after people =

This is a list of scientific equations named after people (eponymous equations).

Equation	Field	Person(s) named after
Adams–Williamson equation	Seismology	L. H. Adams and E. D. Williamson
Allen–Cahn equation	Phase separation	S. Allen and John W. Cahn
Archard equation	Materials science	John F. Archard
Arrhenius equation	Chemical kinetics	Svante Arrhenius
Aryabhata equation	Number theory	Aryabhata
Ashkin–Teller model	Statistical mechanics	Edward Teller Julius Ashkin
Avrami equation	Phase transformation	Melvin Avrami
Batchelor–Chandrasekhar equation	Turbulence	George Batchelor and Subrahmanyan Chandrasekhar
Bateman equation	Radioactivity	Harry Bateman
Bellman equation	Control theory	Richard Bellman
Beltrami equation	Differential geometry	Eugenio Beltrami
Benedict–Webb–Rubin equation	Fluid dynamics	M. Benedict, G. B. Webb, and L. C. Rubin
Benjamin–Bona–Mahony equation Benjamin–Ono equation	Fluid dynamics, Wave mechanics Waves in fluids	T. B. Benjamin, J. L. Bona, and J. J. Mahony; T. B. Benjamin and H. Ono
Bernoulli's equation	Fluid dynamics	Daniel Bernoulli
Bernoulli differential equation	Calculus	Jacob Bernoulli
Bessel differential equation	Special functions	Friedrich Bessel
Birch–Murnaghan equation of state	Continuum mechanics	Francis Birch and Francis D. Murnaghan
Birkhoff–Rott equation	Fluid dynamics	Garrett Birkhoff
Black's equation	Electronics	James R. Black
Black–Scholes equation	Mathematical finance	Fischer Black and Myron Scholes
Blaney–Criddle equation	Agronomy	Blaney and Criddle
Boltzmann equation	Thermodynamics	Ludwig Boltzmann
Bôcher's equation	Calculus	Maxime Bôcher
Borda–Carnot equation	Fluid dynamics	Jean-Charles de Borda and Lazare Carnot
Boussinesq equations	Wave mechanics	Joseph Boussinesq
Breit equation	Quantum mechanics	Gregory Breit
Bridgman's equation Bridgman's thermodynamic equations	Dimensional analysis Thermodynamics	Percy Williams Bridgman; Percy Williams Bridgman
Broer–Kaup–Kupershmidt equation	Wave mechanics	Lambertus Broer, D. J. Kaup, and B. A. Kupershmidt
Buckley–Leverett equation	Two-phase flow in porous media	S. E. Buckley and M. C. Leverett
Burgers' equation	Fluid dynamics	Johannes Martinus Burgers
Cahn–Hilliard equation	Phase separation	John W. Cahn and John E. Hilliard
Callan–Symanzik equation	Quantum field theory	Curtis Callan and Kurt Symanzik
Callendar–Van Dusen equation	Thermodynamics	Hugh Longbourne Callendar and M. S. Van Dusen
Camassa–Holm equation	Fluid dynamics	Roberto Camassa and Darryl Holm
Carmona-Orbezo number	Flow electrode capacitive deionization	Aranzazu Carmona-Orbezo
Carothers equation	Polymer chemistry	Wallace Carothers
Cauchy's equation Cauchy momentum equation Cauchy's functional equation Cauchy's integral formula Cauchy–Euler equation Cauchy–Riemann equations	Optics; Fluid dynamics Functional theory Complex analysis Calculus; Complex analysis	Augustin Louis Cauchy; Augustin Louis Cauchy; Augustin Louis Cauchy; Augustin Louis Cauchy; Augustin Louis Cauchy and Leonhard Euler; Augustin Louis Cauchy and Bernhard Riemann
Cesàro equation	Differential geometry	Ernesto Cesàro
Chandrasekhar–Page equations	General relativity	Subrahmanyan Chandrasekhar and Page
Chaplygin's equation	Transonic flow	Sergey Chaplygin
Chapman–Kolmogorov equation Chapman–Enskog equation	Probability theory Kinetic theory	Sydney Chapman and Andrey Kolmogorov; Sydney Chapman and David Enskog
Chebyshev equation	Calculus	Pafnuty Chebyshev
Chrystal's equation	Differential equations	George Chrystal
Churchill–Bernstein equation	Heat Transfer	S. W. Churchill and M. Bernstein
Clairaut's equation	Calculus	Alexis Clairaut
Clarke's equation	Combustion	John Frederick Clarke
Clausius–Clapeyron equation	Calculus	Rudolf Clausius and Émile Clapeyron
Clausius–Mossotti equation	Physics	Rudolf Clausius and Ottaviano-Fabrizio Mossotti
Colebrook equation Colebrook–White equation	Fluid dynamics Fluid dynamics	C. F. Colebrook; C. F. Colebrook and F. M. White
Competitive Lotka–Volterra equations	Population dynamics	Alfred J. Lotka and Vito Volterra
Conformal Killing equation	Topology, Differential geometry	Wilhelm Killing
Darcy–Weisbach equation	Fluid dynamics	Henry Darcy and Julius Weisbach
Davey–Stewartson equation	Fluid dynamics	A. Davey and K. Stewartson
Debye–Hückel equation	Electrochemistry	Peter Debye and Erich Hückel
Degasperis–Procesi equation	Mathematical physics	Antonio Degasperis and M. Procesi
Dehn–Sommerville equations	Geometry	Max Dehn and Duncan Sommerville
Diophantine equation	Mathematics	Diophantus of Alexandria
Dirac equation Dirac equation in APS	Quantum mechanics Quantum field theory	Paul Dirac; Paul Dirac
Doppler equations	Wave mechanics	Christian Doppler
Drake equation	Cosmology	Frank Drake
Duffing equation	Differential equations	Duffing
Dym equation	Wave mechanics	Harry Dym
Einstein field equations	General relativity	Albert Einstein
Ernst equation	PDE	Frederick J. Ernst
Euler equations (fluid dynamics); Euler's equations (rigid body dynamics); Euler–Bernoulli beam equation Euler–Lagrange equation Euler–Darboux equation Euler–Poisson–Darboux equation Euler–Tricomi equation	Fluid dynamics Rigid body dynamics Solid mechanics Calculus of variations Calculus; Calculus; Calculus	Leonhard Euler; Leonhard Euler; Leonhard Euler and Daniel Bernoulli; Leonhard Euler and Joseph Louis Lagrange; Leonhard Euler and Jean Darboux; Euler, Poisson, and Jean Darboux; Leonhard Euler and Francesco Tricomi
Exner equation	Geology, Sedimentology	Felix Maria Exner
Eyring–Polanyi equation	Chemical kinetics	Henry Eyring and Michael Polanyi
Faddeev equations	Quantum mechanics	Ludvig Faddeev
Falkner–Skan equation	Boundary layer flow	V. M. Falkner and S. W. Skan
Falkowich–Kármán equation	Transonic flow	Falkowich and Theodore von Kármán
Fenske equation	Distillation	Merrell Fenske
Fisher equation	Financial mathematics	Irving Fisher
Fisher's equation	Mathematics	Ronald Fisher
Fokker–Planck equation	Probability theory	Adriaan Fokker and Max Planck
Föppl–von Kármán equations	Elasticity	August Föppl and Theodore von Kármán
Fowler–Nordheim equation	Condensed matter physics	Ralph H. Fowler and Lothar Wolfgang Nordheim
Fredholm integral equation	Integral equations	Erik Fredholm
Fresnel equations	Wave optics	Augustin-Jean Fresnel
Friedmann equations	Cosmology	Alexander Friedman
Gauss–Codazzi equations Gauss–Codazzi equations (relativity)	Riemannian geometry General relativity	Carl Friedrich Gauss and Delfino Codazzi; Carl Friedrich Gauss and Delfino Codazzi
Gibbs–Duhem equation Gibbs–Helmholtz equation	Thermodynamics; Thermodynamics	Josiah Willard Gibbs and Pierre Duhem; Josiah Willard Gibbs and Hermann von Helmholtz
Ginzburg–Landau equation	Superconductivity	Lev Landau and Vitaly Ginzburg
Goldman–Hodgkin–Katz flux equation Goldman–Hodgkin–Katz voltage equation	Electrochemistry; Electrochemistry	David E. Goldman, Alan Hodgkin, and Bernard Katz; David E. Goldman, Alan Hodgkin, and Bernard Katz
Grad–Shafranov equation	Magnetohydrodynamics, Plasma physics	H. Grad and Vitaly D. Shafranov
Green–Kubo relations	Statistical mechanics	M. S. Green and Ryogo Kubo
Gross–Pitaevskii equation	Condensed matter physics	E. P. Gross and Lev P. Pitaevskii
Haaland equation	Fluid dynamics	S. E. Haaland
Hadamard–Rybczynski equation	Bubble dynamics	Jacques Hadamard and Witold Rybczyński
Hamilton–Jacobi equation Hamilton–Jacobi–Bellman equation	Hamiltonian mechanics Optimal control	William Hamilton and Carl Gustav Jacobi; William Hamilton, Carl Gustav Jacobi, and Richard Bellman
Hammett equation	Organic chemistry	Louis Plack Hammett
Hankinson's equation	Wood science	Hankinson
Hartree equation	Atomic physics	Douglas Hartree
Hartree–Fock equation	Quantum chemistry	Douglas Hartree and Vladimir Fock
Hasegawa–Mima equation	Plasma physics	Akira Hasegawa and Kunioki Mima
Hazen–Williams equation	Hydraulics, Irrigation	Hazen and Williams
Helmholtz equation	Electromagnetic radiation, Seismology, Acoustics	Hermann von Helmholtz
Henderson–Hasselbalch equation	Chemistry	Lawrence Joseph Henderson and Karl Albert Hasselbalch
Heun's equation	Calculus	Karl L. W. M. Heun
Hicks equation	Fluid dynamics	William Mitchinson Hicks
Hill equation (biochemistry)	Biochemistry	Archibald Vivian Hill
Hill differential equation	Orbital mechanics	George William Hill
Hugoniot equation	Compressible flows	Pierre Henri Hugoniot
Hunter–Saxton equation Hunter–Zheng equation	Liquid crystals PDE	John K. Hunter and Ralph Saxton; John K. Hunter and Yuxi Zheng
Ishimori equation	PDE	Y. Ishimori
John's equation	Calculus	Fritz John
Johnson–Holmquist equation of state	Ceramic science	Johnson Holmquist
Kadomtsev–Petviashvili equation Kadomtsev–Petviashvili–Burgers equation	Wave mechanics Wave mechanics	B. B. Kadomtsev and V. I. Petviashvili; B. B. Kadomtsev, V. I. Petviashvili, and J. M. Burgers
Kapustinskii equation	Crystallography	Anatoli Kapustinskii
Kármán–Howarth equation	Turbulence	Theodore von Kármán and Leslie Howarth
Karplus equation	Nuclear magnetic resonance	Martin Karplus
Kaup–Kupershmidt equation	Wave mechanics	D. J. Kaup and B. A. Kupershmidt
Kepler's equation	Astronomy	Johannes Kepler
Klein–Gordon equation	Quantum field theory	Oskar Klein and Walter Gordon
Kohn–Sham equations	Mathematics	Walter Kohn and Lu Jeu Sham
Kolmogorov backward equation	Probability distribution	Andrey Kolmogorov
Kolmogorov–Feller equation	Probabilistic models	Andrey Kolmogorov and William Feller
Korteweg–de Vries equation	Wave mechanics, Solitons	Diederik Korteweg and Gustav de Vries
Kozeny–Carman equation	Fluid dynamics, Unit operations	Josef Kozeny and Philip C. Carman
Krichever–Novikov equation	Lie algebra	I. M. Krichever and Sergei Novikov
Laguerre's equation	Differential equation	Edmond Laguerre
Lamm equation	Sedimentation theory	O. Lamm
Landau–Lifshitz equation	Aeroacoustics	Lev Landau and Evgeny Lifshitz
Landau–Lifshitz–Gilbert equation	Magnetization	Lev Landau, Evgeny Lifshitz, and T. L. Gilbert
Lane–Emden equation	Astrophysics	Jonathan Homer Lane and Robert Emden
Langevin equation	Statistical physics	Paul Langevin
Laplace's equation Laplace's tidal equations	Electromagnetism, Fluid dynamics Fluid dynamics	Pierre-Simon Laplace; Pierre-Simon Laplace
Legendre's equation	Spherical harmonics	Adrien-Marie Legendre
Leonard–Merritt formula	Astrophysics	Peter Leonard and David Merritt
Levy–Mises equations	Solid mechanics	Paul Lévy and Richard von Mises
Liénard equation	Dynamical systems	Alfred-Marie Liénard
Lighthill equation	Aeroacoustics	James Lighthill
Lindblad equation	Quantum mechanics	G. Lindblad
Lin–Tsien equation	PDE	Lin and Tsien
Liñán's equation	Combustion	Amable Liñán
Lindley equation	Queueing theory	Dennis Lindley
Liouville equations	Differential geometry	Joseph Liouville
Lommel differential equation	Calculus	Eugen von Lommel
Lorentz equation	Electromagnetism	Hendrik Lorentz
Lorentz–Lorenz equation	Optics	Hendrik Lorentz and Ludvig Lorenz
Lotka–Volterra equation	Biological systems	Alfred J. Lotka and Vito Volterra
Lyapunov equation	Control theory	Aleksandr Lyapunov
Madelung equations	Quantum mechanics	Erwin Madelung
Majorana equation	Quantum field theory	Ettore Majorana
Manakov equation	Wave mechanics, Fiber optics	S. V. Manakov
Marchenko equation	Scattering theory	Vladimir Marchenko
Mark–Houwink equation	Polymer chemistry	Herman Francis Mark and Houwink
Mason equation	Atmospheric thermodynamics	Basil John Mason
Mason–Weaver equation	Sedimentation theory	Max Mason and Warren Weaver
Mathieu equation	Periodic phenomena, Parametric resonance	Émile Léonard Mathieu
Mathisson–Papapetrou–Dixon equations	General relativity, Gravitational waves	Mathisson, A. Papapetrou, and G. W. Dixon
Maurer–Cartan equation	Lie groups, Differential geometry	Ludwig Maurer and Élie Joseph Cartan
Maxwell's equations Maxwell relations	Electrodynamics; Thermodynamics	James Clerk Maxwell; James Clerk Maxwell
Mayo–Lewis equation	Polymer chemistry	Frank R. Mayo and Frederick M. Lewis
Michaelis–Menten equation	Chemical kinetics	Leonor Michaelis and Maud Menten
Monge–Ampère equation	Calculus	Gaspard Monge and André-Marie Ampère
Morison equation	Fluid dynamics	J. R. Morison
Nahm equations	Differential equations	Werner Nahm
Navier–Stokes equations	Fluid dynamics	Claude-Louis Navier and George Gabriel Stokes
Nernst equation	Electrochemistry	Walther Nernst
Neugebauer equations	Printing systems	Hans E. J. Neugebauer
Newton–Euler equations	Classical mechanics	Isaac Newton and Leonhard Euler
Nonlinear Schrödinger equation	Theoretical physics	Erwin Schrödinger
Ornstein–Zernike equation	Statistical mechanics	Leonard Ornstein and Frits Zernike
Painlevé equations	Differential equations	Paul Painlevé
Orr–Sommerfeld equation	Fluid dynamics, Stability analysis	William McFadden Orr and Arnold Sommerfeld
Osipkov–Merritt model	Astrophysics	Leonid Osipkov and David Merritt
Papapetrou–Dixon equations	General relativity, Gravitational waves	A. Papapetrou and G. W. Dixon
Pauli equation	Quantum mechanics	Wolfgang Pauli
Pell's equation	Number theory	John Pell
Penman equation Penman–Monteith equation	Agronomy; Agronomy	Howard Penman; Howard Penman and J. L. Monteith
Picard–Fuchs equation	Calculus	Charles Émile Picard and Lazarus Fuchs
Poisson's equation Poisson–de Rham equation	Calculus; Astrophysics	Siméon Denis Poisson; Siméon Denis Poisson and Georges de Rham
Pople—Nesbet equations	Quantum Chemistry	John Pople and R. K. Nesbet
Prandtl–Glauert equation	Compressible flows	Ludwig Prandtl and Hermann Glauert
Price equation	Evolutionary dynamics, Evolutionary biology	George R. Price
Prony equation	Hydraulics	Gaspard de Prony
Rabinovich–Fabrikant equations	Chaotic systems	M. I. Rabinovich and A. L. Fabrikant
Ramanujan–Nagell equation	Number theory	Srinivasa Ramanujan and Trygve Nagell
Randles–Sevcik equation	Cyclic voltammetry	John Edward Brough Randles
Rankine–Hugoniot equation	Compressible flows	William Rankine and Pierre Henri Hugoniot
Rarita–Schwinger equation	Quantum electrodynamics	William Rarita and Julian Schwinger
Raychaudhuri equation	General relativity	Amal Kumar Raychaudhuri
Rayleigh's equation Rayleigh–Pitot equation Rayleigh–Plesset equation	Stability of inviscid flows Gas dynamics Bubble oscillation	Lord Rayleigh; Lord Rayleigh and Henri Pitot; Lord Rayleigh and Milton S. Plesset
Reynolds-averaged Navier–Stokes equations	Turbulent flows	Osborne Reynolds, Claude-Louis Navier, and George Stokes
Relativistic Euler equations	Astrophysics, Fluid dynamics	Leonhard Euler
Riccati equation	Calculus	Jacopo Riccati
Richards equation	Hydrology	Lorenzo Richards
Riemann theta function Riemann zeta function Riemann's differential equation	Special functions Number theory Differential equation	Bernhard Riemann; Bernhard Riemann; Bernhard Riemann
Rodrigues equation	Chromatography	Alirio E. Rodrigues
Roothaan equations or Roothaan–Hall equations	Quantum chemistry	Clemens Roothaan and George Hall
Sackur–Tetrode equation	Statistical thermodynamics	Hugo Martin Tetrode and Otto Sackur
Sagan equation	Cosmology	Carl Sagan
Saha–Langmuir equation	Quantum mechanics, Statistical mechanics	Megh Nad Saha and Irving Langmuir
Saint-Venant equations	Fluid dynamics	Adhémar Jean Claude Barré de Saint-Venant
Sakuma–Hattori equation	Thermal radiation	Fumihiro Sakuma and Susumu Hattori
Sawada–Kotera equation	Wave mechanics	K. Sawada and T. Kotera
Scheil–Gulliver equation	Metallurgy	G. H. Gulliver and E. Scheil
Schrödinger equation Schrödinger–Newton equations	Quantum mechanics Quantum mechanics	Erwin Schrödinger; Erwin Schrödinger and Isaac Newton
Schwinger–Dyson equation	Quantum field theory	Julian Schwinger and Freeman Dyson
Screened Poisson equation	Plasma physics	Siméon Denis Poisson
Seiberg–Witten equation	PDE	Nathan Seiberg and Edward Witten
Sellmeier equation	Optics	W. Sellmeier
sine–Gordon equation	Solitons	Walter Gordon
Slutsky equation	Consumer theory	Eugen Slutsky
Souders–Brown equation	Separation processes	M. Souders and G. G. Brown
Starling equation	Fluid dynamics	Ernest Starling
Stokes–Einstein equation	Diffusion of particles	George Gabriel Stokes and Albert Einstein
Strominger's equations	Heterotic string theory	Andrew Strominger
Stuart–Landau equation	Fluid dynamics	John Trevor Stuart and Lev Landau
Sturm–Liouville equation	Differential equation	Jacques Charles François Sturm and Joseph Liouville
Swamee–Jain equation	Fluid dynamics	P. K. Swamee and A. K. Jain
Swift–Hohenberg equation	Pattern formation	J. B. Swift and P. C. Hohenberg
Sylvester equation Sylvester's formula	Control theory Matrix theory	James Sylvester; James Sylvester
Taft equation	Physical organic chemistry	Robert W. Taft
Tanaka equation	Stochastic theory	Hiroshi Tanaka
Taylor–Goldstein equation	Fluid dynamics	G.I. Taylor and Sydney Goldstein
Torricelli's equation	Mechanics	Evangelista Torricelli
Tricomi equation	Partial differential equations	Francesco Tricomi
Tsiolkovsky rocket equation	Astrodynamics	Konstantin Tsiolkovsky
Van Deemter's equation	Chromatography	J. J. Van Deemter
Van der Pol equation	Dynamical systems	Balthasar van der Pol
Van der Waals equation	Thermodynamics	Johannes Diderik van der Waals
Van 't Hoff equation	Chemical thermodynamics	Jacobus Henricus van 't Hoff
Verhulst equation	Population dynamics	Pierre François Verhulst
Vlasov equation Vlasov–Poisson equation	Plasma physics Plasma physics	Anatoly Vlasov; Anatoly Vlasov and Siméon Denis Poisson
Volterra integral equation	Integral equations	Vito Volterra
Wald's equation	Probability theory	Abraham Wald
Washburn's equation	Flow in porous media	Edward W. Washburn
Weber's equation	Differential equation	Heinrich Friedrich Weber
Welch–Satterthwaite equation	Statistics, Uncertainty analysis	B. L. Welch and F. E. Satterthwaite
Wheeler–deWitt equation	Quantum gravity	John Archibald Wheeler and Bryce DeWitt
Whewell equation	Geometry	William Whewell
Whitham equation	Wave mechanics, Solitons	Gerald Whitham
Wiener equation	Brownian motion	Norbert Wiener
Yang–Baxter equation Yang–Mills–Higgs equations	Statistical mechanics Gauge theory, Quantum field theory	Chen Ning Yang and Rodney J. Baxter; Chen Ning Yang, Robert Mills, and Peter Higgs
Young–Dupré equation Young–Laplace equation	Interfacial dynamics Fluid dynamics	Thomas Young and Lewis Dupré; Thomas Young and Pierre-Simon Laplace
Zakai equation	Stochastic differential equations	M. Zakai
Zakharov–Schulman system of equation	Acoustic waves	Vladimir E. Zakharov and E. I. Schulman

== See also ==
- Eponym
- List of eponymous laws
- List of laws in science
- List of equations
- Scientific constants named after people
- Scientific phenomena named after people
- Scientific laws named after people
