= Camassa =

Camassa is an Italian surname. Notable people with the surname include:

- Francisco Antonio Camassa (1588–1646), Italian Jesuit schola
- Pamela Camassa (born 1984), Italian television presenter, actress and model

== See also ==
- Camassa–Holm equation
- Camaso
- Camusso
