= Nagell =

Nagell is a surname.

Notable people with this surname include:

- Richard Case Nagell, former military officer who claimed to have had foreknowledge of the John F. Kennedy assassination
- Tinius Nagell-Erichsen (1934–2007), Norwegian publisher, noted for his leadership of the Schibsted media conglomerate
- Trygve Nagell (1895–1988), Norwegian mathematician, known for his works on the Diophantine equations within number theory

== See also ==
- Nagell–Lutz theorem, in mathematics
- Ramanujan–Nagell equation, in mathematics
