= Rybczynski =

Rybczynski, or Rybczyński, is a surname of Polish origin. Notable people with this surname include:

- Natalia Rybczynski (born 1971), Canadian paleobiologist
- Tadeusz Rybczynski (1923-1998), Polish-British economist
- Witold Rybczyński (1881-1949), Polish physicist and mathematician
- Witold Rybczynski (born 1943), Canadian architect
- Zbigniew Rybczyński (born 1949), Polish filmmaker

== See also ==
- Hadamard–Rybczynski equation
- Rybczynski theorem
