= Integro-differential equation =

Equation involving both integrals and derivatives of a function

In mathematics, an integro-differential equation is an equation that involves both integrals and derivatives of a function.

== General first order linear equations ==
The general first-order, linear (only with respect to the term involving derivative) integro-differential equation is of the form

$$\frac{d}{dx}u(x) + \int_{x_0}^x f(t,u(t))\,dt = g(x,u(x)), \qquad u(x_0) = u_0, \qquad x_0 \ge 0.$$

As is typical with differential equations, obtaining a closed-form solution can often be difficult. In the relatively few cases where a solution can be found, it is often by some kind of integral transform, where the problem is first transformed into an algebraic setting. In such situations, the solution of the problem may be derived by applying the inverse transform to the solution of this algebraic equation.

=== Example ===
Consider the following second-order problem,

$$u'(x) + 2u(x) + 5\int_{0}^{x}u(t)\,dt = \theta(x)
\qquad \text{with} \qquad u(0)=0,$$

where

$$\theta(x) = \left\{ \begin{array}{ll}
1, \qquad x \geq 0\\
0, \qquad x < 0 \end{array}
\right.$$

is the Heaviside step function. The Laplace transform is defined by,

$$U(s) = \mathcal{L} \left\{u(x)\right\}=\int_0^{\infty} e^{-sx} u(x) \,dx.$$

Upon taking term-by-term Laplace transforms, and utilising the rules for derivatives and integrals, the integro-differential equation is converted into the following algebraic equation,

$$s U(s) - u(0) + 2U(s) + \frac{5}{s}U(s) = \frac{1}{s}.$$

Thus,

$$U(s) = \frac{1}{s^2 + 2s + 5}$$.

Inverting the Laplace transform using contour integral methods then gives

$$u(x) = \frac{1}{2} e^{-x} \sin(2x) \theta(x)$$.

Alternatively, one can complete the square and use a table of Laplace transforms ("exponentially decaying sine wave") or recall from memory to proceed:

$$U(s) = \frac{1}{s^2 + 2s + 5} = \frac{1}{2} \frac{2}{(s+1)^2+4} \Rightarrow u(x) = \mathcal L^{-1}\left\{ U(s) \right\} = \frac{1}{2} e^{-x} \sin(2x) \theta(x)$$.

== Applications ==
Integro-differential equations model many situations from science and engineering, such as in circuit analysis. By Kirchhoff's second law, the net voltage drop across a closed loop equals the voltage impressed $E(t)$. (It is essentially an application of energy conservation.) An RLC circuit therefore obeys
$$L \frac{d}{dt}I(t) + RI(t) + \frac{1}{C} \int_{0}^{t} I(\tau) d\tau = E(t),$$
where $I(t)$ is the current as a function of time, $R$ is the resistance, $L$ the inductance, and $C$ the capacitance.

The activity of interacting inhibitory and excitatory neurons can be described by a system of integro-differential equations, see for example the Wilson-Cowan model.

The Whitham equation is used to model nonlinear dispersive waves in fluid dynamics.

=== Epidemiology ===
Integro-differential equations have found applications in epidemiology, the mathematical modeling of epidemics, particularly when the models contain age-structure or describe spatial epidemics. The Kermack-McKendrick theory of infectious disease transmission is one particular example where age-structure in the population is incorporated into the modeling framework.

== See also ==
- Delay differential equation
- Differential equation
- Integral equation
- Integrodifference equation
