= Ishimori =

Ishimori (written: 石森 lit. "stone forest") is a Japanese surname. Notable people with the surname include:

- Taiji Ishimori (石森 太二, born 1983), Japanese professional wrestler
- Takkō Ishimori (石森 達幸, 1932–2013), Japanese voice actor

== See also ==
- Shotaro Ishinomori (石ノ森 章太郎, 1938–1998), Japanese manga artist, formerly known as Shotaro Ishimori
- Ishimori Productions, a Japanese production company
- Ishimori equation, a partial differential equation
