= Camusso =

Camusso is an Italian surname. Notable people with the surname include:

- Francesco Camusso (1908 –1995), Italian professional road racing cyclist
- Susanna Camusso (born 1955), Italian trade unionist and former General Secretary of the CGIL

== See also ==
- Camaso
- Camassa
