= Procesi =

Procesi is an Italian surname. Notable people with the surname include:

- Claudio Procesi (born 1941), Italian mathematician, father of Michela
- Michela Procesi (born 1973), Italian mathematician, daughter of Claudio
