= John Mason (meteorologist) =

British meteorologist (1923–2015)

Sir John Mason CB FRS
- Born: Basil John Mason; 18 August 1923; Docking, Norfolk, England
- Died: 6 January 2015 (aged 91)
- Education: University College, Nottingham
- Awards: Knight Bachelor (1979); CB (1973); FRS (1965); Doctor of Science (London)
- Scientific career
- Workplaces: Met Office; UMIST

Sir Basil John Mason CB FRS (18 August 1923 – 6 January 2015) was a British expert on cloud physics. He was Director-General of the Meteorological Office from 1965 to 1983 and Chancellor of the University of Manchester Institute of Science and Technology (UMIST) from 1994 to 1996.

== Education and early life ==
Mason was born in Docking, Norfolk. and educated at Fakenham Grammar School and University College, Nottingham.

He served in the Radar branch of the RAF during the Second World War as a Flight-lieutenant. After being awarded a first class degree in physics by the University of London he was in 1948 appointed lecturer in the postgraduate Department of Meteorology at Imperial College, London. He married Doreen Jones, with whom he had two sons.

== Career ==
He worked at Imperial College from 1948 to 1965, being appointed Professor of Cloud Physics in 1961. His work concerned the physical processes involved in the formation of clouds and the release of rain, snow or hail and led to the Mason equation, which defines the growth or evaporation of small water droplets.

In the 1960s, he helped to modernise the World Meteorological Organization.

From 1965 to 1983 he was Director of the UK Meteorological Office at Bracknell, where he also developed theories to explain how electric charge is separated in thunderclouds, ultimately leading to lightning. Mason was elected a Fellow at Imperial College in 1974. His doctoral students included John Latham.

John Mason died in 2015. After his death, the Sir John Mason Academic Trust was established by his family and is chaired by his son, Nigel Mason, the head of the School of Physical Sciences at the University of Kent.

== Awards and honours ==
In 1965 he was awarded the Chree Medal and in 1974 the Glazebrook Medal from the Institute of Physics and was President of the Institute from 1976 to 1978.

From 1968 to 1970 he was President of the Royal Meteorological Society of which he was an honorary member, and from whom he received the Symons Gold Medal in 1975. In 1974 he was invited to deliver the MacMillan Memorial Lecture to the Institution of Engineers and Shipbuilders in Scotland, choosing the subject "Recent Developments in Weather Forecasting".

Mason was elected a Fellow of the Royal Society (FRS) in 1965 and in 1972 received their Rumford Medal. He was Treasurer of the Society from 1976 to 1986, gave their 1990 Rutherford Memorial Lecture in Canada and in 1991 received their Royal Medal.

In 1991 Mason also received an Honorary Doctorate from Heriot-Watt University. He was a fellow of the Norwegian Academy of Science and Letters from 1993.

In 1973, he was made a companion of the Order of the Bath and in 1979 was knighted for his services to meteorology. He was Chancellor of the University of Manchester Institute of Science and Technology from 1965 to 1996, when he was succeeded by Sir Roland Smith. In 1998 he received an honorary Doctor of Science degree from the University of Reading.

The National Portrait Gallery contains a portrait of Mason. In 2004, Mason opened the Mason Centre for Environmental Flows at the University of Manchester. In 2006, an endowment from Mason enabled the Royal Meteorological Society to establish the Mason Gold Medal. Mason was also Chairman of the British Physics Olympiad Committee.

== Bibliography ==
- The Physics of Clouds (1957)
- Clouds, Rain and Rainmaking (1962); 2nd edition 1976
- The Surface Waters Acidification Programme (editor, 1990) ISBN 978-0511600067
- Acid Rain: Its Causes and its Effects on Inland Waters (1992) ISBN 978-0198583448
- Highlights in Environmental Research – Professorial Inaugural Lectures at Imperial College (editor, 2000). ISBN 978-1860941030
- B.J. Mason (1957) The Physics of Clouds Oxford University Press
