= Euler–Arnold equation =

Class of partial differential equations

In mathematical physics and differential geometry, the Euler–Arnold equations are a class of partial differential equations (PDEs) that describe the geodesic flow on infinite-dimensional Lie groups equipped with right-invariant metrics. These equations generalize classical mechanical systems, such as rigid body motion and ideal fluid flow (Euler equation), by interpreting their evolution as geodesic flow on a group of transformations. Introduced by Vladimir Arnold in 1966, this perspective unifies diverse PDEs arising in fluid dynamics, elasticity, and other areas, in a common geometrical framework. In hydrodynamics, they serve the purpose of describing the motion of inviscid, incompressible fluids. A great number of results related to this are included in now called Euler–Arnold theory, whose main idea is to geometrically interpret ODEs on infinite-dimensional manifolds as PDEs (and vice-versa).

Many PDEs from fluid dynamics are just special cases of the Euler–Arnold equation when viewed from suitable Lie groups: Burgers' equation, Korteweg–De Vries equation, Camassa–Holm equation, Hunter–Saxton equation, and many more.

== Context ==
In 1966, Arnold published the paper "Sur la géométrie différentielle des groupes de Lie de dimension infinie et ses applications à l'hydrodynamique des fluides parfaits" ('On the differential geometry of infinite-dimensional Lie groups and its applications to the hydrodynamics of perfect fluids'), in which he presented a common geometric interpretation for both the Euler's equations for rotating rigid bodies and the Euler's equations of fluid dynamics, this effectively linked topics previously thought to be unrelated, and enabled mathematical solutions to many questions related to fluid flows and their turbulence.

== Mathematical details and basic examples ==
Let $G$ be a Lie group with Lie algebra $\mathfrak g$. In the most basic case $G=\operatorname{SO}(3)$, the (three-dimensional) rotation group, and the Lie algebra $\mathfrak g=\mathfrak{so}(3)$ is the three-dimensional Euclidean space equipped with the cross product. The inertia tensor $A$ is a positive-definite (symmetric) linear operator $A:\mathfrak g\to\mathfrak g^*$. Then the Hamiltonian is
$$H=\frac12 \langle L,A^{-1}L\rangle$$
where $L$ is the angular momentum. Arnold's idea is to interpret this Hamiltonian as a geodesic Hamiltonian of a (right-invariant) Riemannian metric on the group. In the case of the rotation group, these geodesic equations lead to the (free) Euler rotation equation of rigid body kinematics.

To see how this leads to the kinematic equations, we work on the cotangent bundle of $G=\operatorname{SO}(3)$. This trivializes as $T^*G=G\times\mathfrak{g}.$ The body configuration is a curve $g=g(t)$ in the group. The body angular velocity $\omega$ is defined by
$$\dot g = g\omega.$$
Let $\mu=g^{-1}dg$ be the Maurer–Cartan form. The canonical one-form is
$$\theta = \langle L, \mu\rangle$$
from which we find the symplectic form by taking the exterior derivative
$$d\theta=\langle dL,\mu\rangle - \frac12\langle L, [\mu,\mu]\rangle$$
by the Maurer–Cartan equation.

The differential of the Hamiltonian is $dH = \langle \omega, dL\rangle.$ We now consider Hamilton's equation $X_H\lrcorner d\theta = -dH$ for the vector field $X_H=(\dot g,\dot L)$ We have
$$X_H\lrcorner d\theta=\langle \dot L,\mu\rangle - \langle dL,g^{-1}\dot g\rangle - \langle L, [\omega,\mu]\rangle=\langle \dot L,\mu\rangle - \langle dL,g^{-1}\dot g\rangle - \langle \operatorname{ad}^*_\omega L, \mu\rangle.$$
We thus get $\omega=g^{-1}\dot g$ and $\dot L - \operatorname{ad}^*_\omega L=0$

To state this in more normal terms in the special case where $G=\operatorname{SO}(3)$ and $\mathfrak g=\mathfrak{so}(3)$, we have $\operatorname{ad}_\omega(\cdot) = \omega\times\cdot$, and therefore as a consequence of the triple product identity $\operatorname{ad}^*_\omega(\cdot) = -\omega\times\cdot$. The equation thus becomes $\dot L + \omega\times L=0$ recognizable as the Euler equation from rigid-body mechanics.

=== Right invariance ===
The right-invariance of the metric is because it expresses the kinematics of the body in the (intrinsic) body frame, in conventions for which the right action of the group acts on the frame bundle, whereas the left action would correspond to transformation of the spatial reference frame of an external observer.

=== General case ===
The preceding section was kept fairly abstract, so it can be generalized to an arbitrary (finite dimensional) Lie group. This group is equipped with an inertia operator $A:\mathfrak g\to\mathfrak g^*$ which is positive-definite and symmetric. The Euler–Arnold equation is the geodesic equation for the Riemannian metric $\langle x,Ay\rangle.$ Exactly as above, the equation reads $\dot L - \operatorname{ad}^*_\omega L=0$ where $\omega=A^{-1}L.$

A key insight is that this equation still makes sense formally when the group $G$ is an infinite dimensional Lie group, but doing proper analysis in that case is very subtle.

Occasionally it is useful to reformulate the Arnold equation using a Riemannian metric directly instead of an inertia operator. To that end, let
$$A(x,y) = \langle x, Ay\rangle$$
where the pairing on the right is between the Lie algebra and its dual. The coadjoint action is then replaced by an operator $B:\mathfrak g\times\mathfrak g\to\mathfrak g$ defined by $A(B(x,y),z) = A(x,[y,z]).$ Thus $B(x,y) = -A^{-1}\operatorname{ad}^*_xAy.$ With these conventions in place, the Arnold equation takes the simple form
$$\dot\omega = B(\omega,\omega),$$
although the connection to the familiar kinematic equations is less clear in the basic example given above.

=== Incompressible fluid flows ===
When the Lie group $G$ is the group of volume-preserving smooth diffeomorphisms of a compact oriented Riemannian manifold with boundary, one obtains, at least formally, the Euler equation from fluid dynamics. The Lie algebra of the group is (formally) all divergence-free smooth vector fields (tangent to the boundary of $M$). The Lie bracket of vector fields defines the Lie algebra structure. The Riemannian metric is
$$A(X,Y) = \int_M (X(m),Y(m))d\mu(m)$$
where on the right, we have the Riemannian metric of $M$ and its volume form.

For the Arnold equation, we must work out the operator $B$. Using the fact that the vector fields are divergence-free, one obtains
$$\int_M (X,[X,Z])=\int_M(-\nabla_XX,Z).$$
thus
$$B(X,X) = -\nabla_XX - \nabla p$$
where the pressure term is inserted because the resulting vector field $B(X,X)$ has to be divergence-free, and $\nabla_XX$ is not, in general. We can write this invariantly as
$$B(X,X)=-P(\nabla_XX)$$
where $P$ is the Leray projection.

We then have precisely the Euler equations of fluid dynamics
$$\frac{dX}{dt} + \nabla_XX = -\nabla p, \quad (\operatorname{div} X=0)$$

=== Korteweg–de Vries equation ===
Let $G$ be the Virasoro group, with Virasoro Lie algebra represented by pairs $(X(x)\partial_x,a)$ where $X$ is a smooth function on the circle, and Lie bracket
$$[(X\partial_x,a),(Y\partial_x,b)]=\left((XY_x-YX_x)\partial_x,\int_{S^1}X'(x)Y''(x)dx\right).$$
The right-invariant metric is
$$g(X,Y) = \frac12\left(\int_{S^1}X(x)Y(x)dx + ab\right).$$
We compute the operator $B((X,a),(X,a))$
$$g\left(B((X,a),(X,a)),(Z,b)\right) = g\left((X,a),[(X,b),(Z,b)]\right)$$
$$=g\left((X,a),\left(XZ'-ZX',\int X'Z''\right)\right)$$
$$=\int(X^2Z' - ZXX' +  aX'Z'')$$
$$=\int(-3XX' +  aX''')Z.$$
So $B(X,X)=(aX_{xxx}-3XX_x, 0)$ and we get the KdV equation
$$X_t = aX_{xxx} -3XX_x,\quad a_t=0.$$

When $a=0$, and so with the metric given here on the group of diffeomorphisms of the circle, without the central extension, we get the inviscid Burgers' equation. On the other hand, with the $H^1$ Sobolev metric on the group of diffeomorphisms, we get the non-dispersive Camassa–Holm equation (derived in this way here.) The dispersive Camassa–Holm equation arises from the Sobolev metric on the Virasoro group.

=== Analytic foundations ===
A rigorous formulation of the Euler–Arnold framework was given by Ebin and Marsden (1970). They showed that the group of volume-preserving diffeomorphisms of a compact Riemannian manifold becomes a smooth Hilbert manifold when enlarged to a Sobolev space class $H^s$, for $s > \dim M/2 +1$. The corresponding tangent space consists of divergence-free vector fields of class $H^s$, and the inner product induces a right-invariant Riemannian metric.

The Hodge decomposition yields an orthogonal projection—known as the Leray projection—which allows the Euler equations to be formulated cleanly as a geodesic equation. This leads to a precise version of the Euler–Arnold equation on the infinite-dimensional manifold of Sobolev diffeomorphisms. Ebin and Marsden established that the geodesic spray associated with this structure is smooth and does not lose derivatives, ensuring that the initial value problem for the incompressible Euler equations is locally well-posed in Sobolev spaces—an important step toward understanding the existence and regularity of fluid flows, as posed in the Navier–Stokes existence and smoothness Millennium Problem.

== See also ==
- Navier–Stokes equation
- Euler–Lagrange equation
