= Ginzburg–Landau equation =

Equation in fluid dynamics

The Ginzburg–Landau equation, named after Vitaly Ginzburg and Lev Landau, describes the nonlinear evolution of small disturbances near a finite wavelength bifurcation from a stable to an unstable state of a system. At the onset of finite wavelength bifurcation, the system becomes unstable for a critical wavenumber $k_c$ which is non-zero. In the neighbourhood of this bifurcation, the evolution of disturbances is characterised by the particular Fourier mode for $k_c$ with slowly varying amplitude $A$ (more precisely the real part of $A$). The Ginzburg–Landau equation is the governing equation for $A$. The unstable modes can either be non-oscillatory (stationary) or oscillatory.

For non-oscillatory bifurcation, $A$ satisfies the real Ginzburg–Landau equation

$$\frac{\partial A}{\partial t} = \nabla^2 A + A - A|A|^2$$

which was first derived by Alan C. Newell and John A. Whitehead and by Lee Segel in 1969. For oscillatory bifurcation, $A$ satisfies the complex Ginzburg–Landau equation

$$\frac{\partial A}{\partial t} = (1+i\alpha)\nabla^2 A + A - (1+i\beta) A|A|^2$$

which was first derived by Keith Stewartson and John Trevor Stuart in 1971. Here $\alpha$ and $\beta$ are real constants.

When the problem is homogeneous, i.e., when $A$ is independent of the spatial coordinates, the Ginzburg–Landau equation reduces to Stuart–Landau equation. The Swift–Hohenberg equation results in the Ginzburg–Landau equation.

Substituting $A(\mathbf x,t) = Re^{i\Theta}$, where $R=|A|$ is the amplitude and $\Theta=\mathrm{arg}(A)$ is the phase, one obtains the following equations

$$\begin{align}
\frac{\partial R}{\partial t} &= [\nabla^2 R - R (\nabla \Theta)^2] - \alpha(2\nabla\Theta\cdot\nabla R + R \nabla^2\Theta) + (1-R^2)R,\\
R\frac{\partial \Theta}{\partial t} & = \alpha[\nabla^2 R - R (\nabla \Theta)^2] + (2\nabla\Theta\cdot\nabla R + R \nabla^2\Theta) - \beta R^3.
\end{align}$$

== Some solutions of the real Ginzburg–Landau equation ==
=== Steady plane-wave type ===
If we substitute $A = f(k) e^{i\mathbf k\cdot\mathbf x}$ in the real equation without the time derivative term, we obtain

$$A(\mathbf x) = \sqrt{1-k^2} e^{i\mathbf k\cdot\mathbf x}, \quad |k|<1.$$

This solution is known to become unstable due to Eckhaus instability for wavenumbers $k^2>1/3.$

=== Steady solution with absorbing boundary condition ===
Once again, let us look for steady solutions, but with an absorbing boundary condition $A=0$ at some location. In a semi-infinite, 1D domain $0\leq x< \infty$, the solution is given by

$$A(x) = e^{ia} \tanh \frac{x}{\sqrt 2},$$

where $a$ is an arbitrary real constant. Similar solutions can be constructed numerically in a finite domain.

== Some solutions of the complex Ginzburg–Landau equation ==
=== Traveling wave ===
The traveling wave solution is given by

$$A(\mathbf x,t) = \sqrt{1-k^2} e^{i\mathbf k\cdot \mathbf x-i\omega t}, \quad \omega = \beta + (\alpha-\beta) k^2, \quad |k|<1.$$

The group velocity of the wave is given by $d\omega/dk = 2(\alpha-\beta)k.$ The above solution becomes unstable due to Benjamin–Feir instability for wavenumbers $k^2>(1+\alpha\beta)/(2\beta^2+\alpha\beta+3).$

=== Hocking–Stewartson pulse ===
Hocking–Stewartson pulse refers to a quasi-steady, 1D solution of the complex Ginzburg–Landau equation, obtained by Leslie M. Hocking and Keith Stewartson in 1972. The solution is given by

$$A(x,t) = \lambda L e^{i\nu t}(\mathrm{sech} \lambda x)^{1+iM}$$

where the four real constants in the above solution satisfy

$$\lambda^2(M^2+2\alpha-1) =1, \quad \lambda^2(\alpha-\alpha M^2+2M) =\nu,$$
$$2-M^2-3\alpha M = -L^2, \quad 2\alpha+3M-\alpha M^2 = -\beta L^2.$$

=== Coherent structure solutions ===
The coherent structure solutions are obtained by assuming $A= e^{i\mathbf k\cdot\mathbf x-\omega t}B(\boldsymbol \xi,t)$ where $\boldsymbol\xi=\mathbf x+\mathbf u t$. This leads to

$$\frac{\partial B}{\partial t} + \mathbf v \cdot \nabla B = (1+i\alpha ) \nabla^2 B + \lambda B - (1+i\beta) B|B|^2$$

where $\mathbf v = \mathbf u + (1+i\alpha) \mathbf k$ and $\lambda = 1+i\omega-(1+i\alpha)k^2.$

== See also ==
- Davey–Stewartson equation
- Stuart–Landau equation
- Swift–Hohenberg equation
- Gross–Pitaevskii equation
