= Davey–Stewartson equation =

Equation in fluid dynamics

In fluid dynamics, the Davey–Stewartson equation (DSE) was introduced in a paper by A. Davey and Keith Stewartson to describe the evolution of a three-dimensional wave-packet on water of finite depth.

It is a system of partial differential equations for a complex (wave-amplitude) field $A\,$ and a real (mean-flow) field $B$:

$$i \frac{\partial A}{\partial t} + c_0 \frac{\partial^2 A}{\partial x^2} + \frac{\partial^2 A}{\partial y^2} = c_1 |A|^2 A + c_2 A\frac{\partial B}{\partial x},$$

$$\frac{\partial^2 B}{\partial x^2} + c_3 \frac{\partial^2 B}{\partial y^2} = \frac{\partial |A|^2}{\partial x}.$$

The DSE is an example of a soliton equation in 2+1 dimensions. The corresponding Lax representation for it is given in Boiti, Martina & Pempinelli (1995).

In 1+1 dimensions the DSE reduces to the nonlinear Schrödinger equation

$$i \frac{\partial A}{\partial t} + \frac{\partial^2 A}{\partial x^2} + 2k |A|^2 A =0.\,$$

Itself, the DSE is the particular reduction of the Zakharov–Schulman system. On the other hand, the equivalent counterpart of the DSE is the Ishimori equation.

The DSE is the result of a multiple-scale analysis of modulated nonlinear surface gravity waves, propagating over a horizontal sea bed.

== See also ==
- Ginzburg–Landau equation
- Nonlinear systems
- Ishimori equation
