= Élisabeth Lutz =

French mathematician (1914–2008)

Élisabeth Lutz (May 14, 1914 – July 31, 2008) was a French mathematician. The Nagell–Lutz theorem in Diophantine geometry describes the torsion points of elliptic curves; it is named after Lutz and Trygve Nagell, who both published it in the 1930s.^{[L37]}

Lutz was a student of André Weil at the University of Strasbourg, from 1934 to 1938. She earned a thesis for her research for him, on elliptic curves over $p$-adic fields. She completed her doctorate (thèse d’état) on $p$-adic Diophantine approximation at the University of Grenoble in 1951 under the supervision of Claude Chabauty; her dissertation was Sur les approximations diophantiennes linéaires $p$-adiques.

She became a professor of mathematics at the University of Grenoble.

== Selected publications ==
- L37.	Lutz, Élisabeth (1937). "Sur l'équation $y^2=x^2-Ax-B$ dans les corps $p$-adiques". Journal für die reine und angewandte Mathematik. 177: 237–247.
