= Darryl Holm =

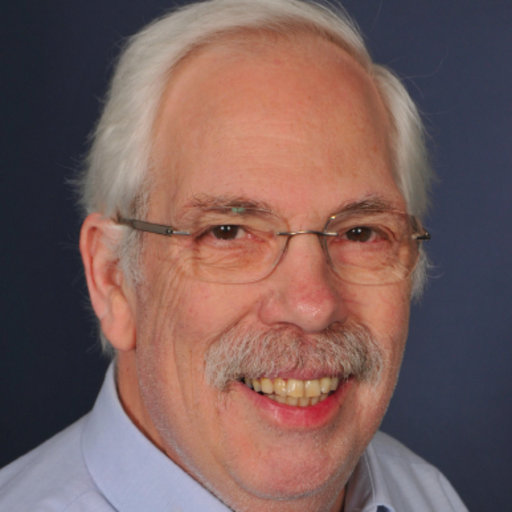
- Darryl Holm at Imperial College London
- Born: 4 October 1947 (age 78); Minneapolis, United States of America
- Scientific career
- Fields: Geometric Mechanics; Fluid Dynamics
- Workplaces: Imperial College London; Los Alamos National Laboratory
- Thesis: Symmetry breaking in fluid dynamics: Lie group reducible motions for real fluids (1976)
- Doctoral advisor: Roy Axford, University of Illinois, Champaign-Urbana
- Website: wwwf.imperial.ac.uk/~dholm/

Darryl Holm (born 4 October 1947) is an American applied mathematician, and Professor of Applied Mathematics and Mathematical Physics in the Department of Mathematics at Imperial College London. He studied Physics at the University of Minnesota (1963-1967), and Physics and Mathematics at the University of Michigan (1967-1971). He joined the Theoretical Design Division of Los Alamos National Laboratory (LANL) in 1972 where he worked on the physics of strong shock waves and high-temperature hydrodynamic phenomena. At LANL Darryl also wrote his PhD dissertation entitled "Symmetry breaking in fluid dynamics: Lie group reducible motions for real fluids", receiving his PhD in 1976, supervised by Roy Axford. A result discovered in this work was later used to substantiate the accuracy of the Los Alamos on-site yield verification method (CORRTEX) for the US-USSR Threshold Test Ban Treaty (TTBT). In 1980, Darryl moved to the Theoretical Division, where he helped found the Center for Nonlinear Studies and served as one of its acting directors.

Darryl's main research contributions have been in nonlinear science, from integrable to chaotic behaviour, from solitons to turbulence, and from fluid dynamics to shape analysis. Much of this work is based on Lie symmetry reduction from Hamilton's principle. Darryl's main activities have been based on his use of geometric mechanics to derive and analyse nonlinear evolution equations for multiscale phenomena. Applications of these equations range from climate modelling and ocean circulation, to template matching in imaging science, to telecommunications. The solution behavior of these equations includes solitons (governed by the Camassa-Holm equation), turbulence (modelled by the LANS-alpha equation), template marching for biomedical images (modelled by the EPDiff equation) and the method of stochastic advection by Lie transport (SALT) for uncertainty quantification and reduction of uncertainty via data assimilation for upper ocean dynamics.

With Roberto Camassa, he derived the Camassa-Holm equation, which is an integrable partial differential equation for nonlinear shallow water waves, whose solutions in the dispersionless limit are peaked solitons, so called peakons, published in 1993. In 2005, he moved to Imperial College London as Professor of Applied Mathematics and Mathematical Physics, supported by a Wolfson fellowship, and was awarded an ERC advanced grant in 2011. Recently Darryl received an ERC synergy grant together with Dan Crisan, Etienne Memin and Bertrand Chapron to perform research on stochastic transport in the upper ocean (2020-2025).

He has written a number of books in geometric mechanics.
