= Stuart number =

Dimensionless parameter in fluid mechanics

The Stuart number (N), also known as magnetic interaction parameter, is a dimensionless number of fluids, i.e. gases or liquids. It is named after mathematician John Trevor Stuart.

It is defined as the ratio of electromagnetic to inertial forces, which gives an estimate of the relative importance of a magnetic field on a flow. The Stuart number is relevant for flows of conducting fluids, e.g. in fusion reactors, steel casters or plasmas.

== Definition ==
$$\mathrm{N} = \frac {B^2 L_c \sigma}{\rho U} = \frac{\mathrm{Ha}^2}{\mathrm{Re}}$$

- B – magnetic field
- L_{c} – characteristic length
- σ – electric conductivity
- U – characteristic velocity scale
- ρ – density
- Ha – Hartmann number
- Re – Reynolds number
