= Francisco Antonio Camassa =

Italian Jesuit scholar

Francisco Antonio Camassa (1588–1646) was an Italian Jesuit scholar who taught at the Colegio Imperial de Madrid.
