= Whitham equation =

Non-local model for non-linear dispersive waves

In mathematical physics, the Whitham equation is a non-local model for non-linear dispersive waves.

The equation is notated as follows:

$\frac{\partial \eta}{\partial t} + \alpha \eta \frac{\partial \eta}{\partial x} + \int_{-\infty}^{+\infty} K(x-\xi)\, \frac{\partial \eta(\xi,t)}{\partial \xi}\, \text{d}\xi = 0.$

This integro-differential equation for the oscillatory variable η(x,t) is named after Gerald Whitham who introduced it as a model to study breaking of non-linear dispersive water waves in 1967. Wave breaking – bounded solutions with unbounded derivatives – for the Whitham equation has recently been proven.

For a certain choice of the kernel K(x − ξ) it becomes the Fornberg–Whitham equation.

== Water waves ==
Using the Fourier transform (and its inverse), with respect to the space coordinate x and in terms of the wavenumber k:

- For surface gravity waves, the phase speed c(k) as a function of wavenumber k is taken as:

$c_\text{ww}(k) = \sqrt{ \frac{g}{k}\, \tanh(kh)},$ while $\alpha_\text{ww} = \frac{3}{2} \sqrt{\frac{g}{h}},$

with g the gravitational acceleration and h the mean water depth. The associated kernel K_{ww}(s) is, using the inverse Fourier transform:

$$K_\text{ww}(s) = \frac{1}{2\pi} \int_{-\infty}^{+\infty} c_\text{ww}(k)\, \text{e}^{iks}\, \text{d}k
= \frac{1}{2\pi} \int_{-\infty}^{+\infty} c_\text{ww}(k)\, \cos(ks)\, \text{d}k,$$

since c_{ww} is an even function of the wavenumber k.

- The Korteweg–de Vries equation (KdV equation) emerges when retaining the first two terms of a series expansion of c_{ww}(k) for long waves with kh ≪ 1:

$c_\text{kdv}(k) = \sqrt{gh} \left( 1 - \frac{1}{6} k^2 h^2 \right),$ $K_\text{kdv}(s) = \sqrt{gh} \left( \delta(s) + \frac{1}{6} h^2\, \delta^{\prime\prime}(s) \right),$ $\alpha_\text{kdv} = \frac{3}{2} \sqrt{\frac{g}{h}},$

with δ(s) the Dirac delta function.

- Bengt Fornberg and Gerald Whitham studied the kernel K_{fw}(s) – non-dimensionalised using g and h:

$K_\text{fw}(s) = \frac12 \nu \text{e}^{-\nu |s|}$ and $c_\text{fw} = \frac{\nu^2}{\nu^2+k^2},$ with $\alpha_\text{fw}=\frac32.$

The resulting integro-differential equation can be reduced to the partial differential equation known as the Fornberg–Whitham equation:

$$\left( \frac{\partial^2}{\partial x^2} - \nu^2 \right)
\left(
\frac{\partial \eta}{\partial t}
+ \frac32\, \eta\, \frac{\partial \eta}{\partial x}
\right)
+ \frac{\partial \eta}{\partial x}
= 0.$$

This equation is shown to allow for peakon solutions – as a model for waves of limiting height – as well as the occurrence of wave breaking (shock waves, absent in e.g. solutions of the Korteweg–de Vries equation).

== Notes and references ==
=== References ===
- Debnath, L. (2005), Nonlinear Partial Differential Equations for Scientists and Engineers, Springer, ISBN 9780817643232
- Fetecau, R.; Levy, Doron (2005), "Approximate Model Equations for Water Waves", Communications in Mathematical Sciences, 3 (2): 159–170, doi:10.4310/CMS.2005.v3.n2.a4
- Fornberg, B.; Whitham, G.B. (1978), "A Numerical and Theoretical Study of Certain Nonlinear Wave Phenomena", Philosophical Transactions of the Royal Society A, 289 (1361): 373–404, Bibcode:1978RSPTA.289..373F, doi:10.1098/rsta.1978.0064, S2CID 7333207
- Hur, Vera Mikyoung (2017), "Wave breaking in the Whitham equation", Advances in Mathematics, 317: 410–437, arXiv:1506.04075, doi:10.1016/j.aim.2017.07.006, S2CID 119121867
- Moldabayev, D.; Kalisch, H.; Dutykh, D. (2015), "The Whitham Equation as a model for surface water waves", Physica D: Nonlinear Phenomena, 309: 99–107, arXiv:1410.8299, Bibcode:2015PhyD..309...99M, doi:10.1016/j.physd.2015.07.010, S2CID 55302388
- Naumkin, P.I.; Shishmarev, I.A. (1994), Nonlinear Nonlocal Equations in the Theory of Waves, American Mathematical Society, ISBN 9780821845738
- Whitham, G.B. (1967), "Variational methods and applications to water waves", Proceedings of the Royal Society A, 299 (1456): 6–25, Bibcode:1967RSPSA.299....6W, doi:10.1098/rspa.1967.0119, S2CID 122802187
- Whitham, G.B. (1974), Linear and nonlinear waves, Wiley-Interscience, Bibcode:1974lnw..book.....W, doi:10.1002/9781118032954, ISBN 978-0-471-94090-6
