= Peakon =

In the theory of integrable systems, a peakon ("peaked soliton") is a soliton with discontinuous first derivative; the wave profile is shaped like the graph of the function $e^{-|x|}$. Some examples of non-linear partial differential equations with (multi-)peakon solutions are the Camassa–Holm shallow water wave equation, the Degasperis–Procesi equation and the Fornberg–Whitham equation. Since peakon solutions are only piecewise differentiable, they must be interpreted in a suitable weak sense. The concept was introduced in 1993 by Camassa and Holm in the short but much cited paper where they derived their shallow water equation.

== A family of equations with peakon solutions ==
The primary example of a PDE which supports peakon solutions is

$$u_t - u_{xxt} + (b+1) u u_x = b u_x u_{xx} + u u_{xxx}, \,$$

where $u(x,t)$ is the unknown function, and b is a parameter. In terms of the auxiliary function $m(x,t)$ defined by the relation $m = u-u_{xx}$, the equation takes the simpler form

$$m_t + m_x u + b m u_x = 0. \,$$

This equation is integrable for exactly two values of b, namely b = 2 (the Camassa–Holm equation) and b = 3 (the Degasperis–Procesi equation).

== Single peakon solution ==
The PDE above admits the travelling wave solution $u(x,t) = c \, e^{-|x-ct|}$, which is a peaked solitary wave with amplitude c and speed c. This solution is called a (single) peakon solution, or simply a peakon. If c is negative, the wave moves to the left with the peak pointing downwards, and then it is sometimes called an antipeakon.

It is not immediately obvious in what sense the peakon solution satisfies the PDE. Since the derivative u_{x} has a jump discontinuity at the peak, the second derivative u_{xx} must be taken in the sense of distributions and will contain a Dirac delta function; in fact, $m = u - u_{xx} = c \, \delta(x-ct)$. Now the product $m u_x$ occurring in the PDE seems to be undefined, since the distribution m is supported at the very point where the derivative u_{x} is undefined. An ad hoc interpretation is to take the value of u_{x} at that point to equal the average of its left and right limits (zero, in this case). A more satisfactory way to make sense of the solution is to invert the relationship between u and m by writing $m = (G/2) * u$, where $G(x) = \exp(-|x|)$, and use this to rewrite the PDE as a (nonlocal) hyperbolic conservation law:

$$\partial_t u + \partial_x \left[\frac{u^2}{2} + \frac{G}{2} * \left(\frac{b u^2}{2} + \frac{(3-b) u_x^2}{2} \right) \right] = 0.$$

(The star denotes convolution with respect to x.) In this formulation the function u can simply be interpreted as a weak solution in the usual sense.

== Multipeakon solutions ==
Two-peakon wave profile (solid curve) formed by adding two peakons (dashed curves): $u = m_1 \, e^{-|x-x_1|} + m_2 \, e^{-|x-x_2|}$

Multipeakon solutions are formed by taking a linear combination of several peakons, each with its own time-dependent amplitude and position. (This is a very simple structure compared to the multisoliton solutions of most other integrable PDEs, like the Korteweg–de Vries equation for instance.) The n-peakon solution thus takes the form

$$u(x,t) = \sum_{i=1}^n m_i(t) \, e^{-|x-x_i(t)|},$$

where the 2n functions $x_i(t)$ and $m_i(t)$ must be chosen suitably in order for u to satisfy the PDE. For the "b-family" above it turns out that this ansatz indeed gives a solution, provided that the system of ODEs

$$\dot{x}_k = \sum_{i=1}^n m_i e^{-|x_k-x_i|},
\qquad
\dot{m}_k = (b-1) \sum_{i=1}^n m_k m_i \sgn(x_k-x_i) e^{-|x_k-x_i|}
\qquad
(k = 1,\dots,n)$$

is satisfied. (Here sgn denotes the sign function.) Note that the right-hand side of the equation for $x_k$ is obtained by substituting $x=x_k$ in the formula for u. Similarly, the equation for $m_k$ can be expressed in terms of $u_x$, if one interprets the derivative of $\exp(-|x|)$ at x = 0 as being zero. This gives the following convenient shorthand notation for the system:

$$\dot{x}_k = u(x_k),
\qquad
\dot{m}_k = -(b-1) m_k u_x(x_k)
\qquad
(k = 1,\dots,n).$$

The first equation provides some useful intuition about peakon dynamics: the velocity of each peakon equals the elevation of the wave at that point.

== Explicit solution formulas ==
In the integrable cases b = 2 and b = 3, the system of ODEs describing the peakon dynamics can be solved explicitly for arbitrary n in terms of elementary functions, using inverse spectral techniques. For example, the solution for n = 3 in the Camassa–Holm case b = 2 is given by

$$\begin{align}
x_1(t) &= \log\frac{(\lambda_1-\lambda_2)^2 (\lambda_1-\lambda_3)^2 (\lambda_2-\lambda_3)^2 a_1 a_2 a_3}{\sum_{j<k} \lambda_j^2 \lambda_k^2 (\lambda_j-\lambda_k)^2 a_j a_k}
\\
x_2(t) &= \log\frac{\sum_{j<k} (\lambda_j-\lambda_k)^2 a_j a_k}{\lambda_1^2 a_1 + \lambda_2^2 a_2 + \lambda_3^2 a_3}
\\
x_3(t) &= \log(a_1+a_2+a_3)
\\
m_1(t) &= \frac{\sum_{j<k} \lambda_j^2 \lambda_k^2 (\lambda_j-\lambda_k)^2 a_j a_k}{\lambda_1 \lambda_2 \lambda_3 \sum_{j<k} \lambda_j \lambda_k (\lambda_j-\lambda_k)^2 a_j a_k}
\\
m_2(t) &= \frac{ \left( \lambda_1^2 a_1 + \lambda_2^2 a_2 + \lambda_3^2 a_3 \right) \sum_{j<k} (\lambda_j-\lambda_k)^2 a_j a_k}{ \left( \lambda_1 a_1 + \lambda_2 a_2 + \lambda_3 a_3 \right) \sum_{j<k} \lambda_j \lambda_k (\lambda_j-\lambda_k)^2 a_j a_k}
\\
m_3(t) &= \frac{a_1+a_2+a_3}{\lambda_1 a_1 + \lambda_2 a_2 + \lambda_3 a_3}
\end{align}$$

where $a_k(t) = a_k(0) e^{t/\lambda_k}$, and where the 2n constants $a_k(0)$ and $\lambda_k$ are determined from initial conditions. The general solution for arbitrary n can be expressed in terms of symmetric functions of $a_k$ and $\lambda_k$. The general n-peakon solution in the Degasperis–Procesi case b = 3 is similar in flavour, although the detailed structure is more complicated.
