= Hans E. J. Neugebauer =

Hans E. J. Neugebauer was a German-born physicist and imaging scientist who later lived in the United States and Canada.

In his 1935 dissertation, he developed the Neugebauer equations, which have served as the basis for more accurate models for the prediction of color produced by printing.
