= Nagell–Lutz theorem =

Describes rational torsion points on elliptic curves over the integers

In mathematics, the Nagell–Lutz theorem is a result in the diophantine geometry of elliptic curves, which describes rational torsion points on elliptic curves over the integers. It is named for Trygve Nagell and Élisabeth Lutz.

== Definition of the terms ==
Suppose that the equation

$$y^2 = x^3 + ax^2 + bx + c$$

defines a non-singular cubic curve E with integer coefficients a, b, c, and let D be the discriminant of the cubic polynomial on the right side:

$$D = -4a^3c + a^2b^2 + 18abc - 4b^3 - 27c^2.$$

== Statement of the theorem ==
If $P = (x,y)$ is a rational point of finite order on E, for the elliptic curve group law, then:

1. x and y are integers;
2. either $y = 0$, in which case P has order two, or else y divides D, which immediately implies that $y^2$ divides D.

== Generalizations ==
The Nagell–Lutz theorem generalizes to arbitrary number fields and more general cubic equations. For curves over the rationals, the generalization says that, for a nonsingular cubic curve whose Weierstrass form

$$y^2 +a_1 x y + a_3 y = x^3 + a_2 x^2 + a_4 x + a_6$$

has integer coefficients, any rational point $P = (x,y)$ of finite order must have integer coordinates, or else have order 2 and coordinates of the form $x=m/4$, $y=n/8$, for m and n integers.

== History ==
The result is named for its two independent discoverers, the Norwegian Trygve Nagell (1895–1988) who published it in 1935, and Élisabeth Lutz (1937).

== See also ==
- Mordell–Weil theorem
