= Stuart–Landau equation =

Equation relating to oscillating systems

The Stuart–Landau equation describes the behavior of a nonlinear oscillating system near the Hopf bifurcation, named after John Trevor Stuart and Lev Landau. In 1944, Landau proposed an equation for the evolution of the magnitude of the disturbance, which is now called as the Landau equation, to explain the transition to turbulence based on a phenomenological argument and an attempt to derive this equation from hydrodynamic equations was done by Stuart for plane Poiseuille flow in 1958. The formal derivation to derive the Landau equation was given by Stuart, Watson and Palm in 1960. The perturbation in the vicinity of bifurcation is governed by the following equation

$$\frac{dA}{dt} = \sigma A - \frac{l}{2} A |A|^2.$$

where

- $A = |A| e^{i\phi}$ is a complex quantity describing the disturbance,
- $\sigma = \sigma_r + i\sigma_i$ is the complex growth rate,
- $l = l_r + i l_i$ is a complex number and $l_r$ is the Landau constant.

The evolution of the actual disturbance is given by the real part of $A(t)$ i.e., by $|A|\cos\phi$. Here the real part of the growth rate is taken to be positive, i.e., $\sigma_r>0$ because otherwise the system is stable in the linear sense, that is to say, for infinitesimal disturbances ($|A|$ is a small number), the nonlinear term in the above equation is negligible in comparison to the other two terms in which case the amplitude grows in time only if $\sigma_r>0$. The Landau constant is also taken to be positive, $l_r>0$ because otherwise the amplitude will grow indefinitely (see below equations and the general solution in the next section). The Landau equation is the equation for the magnitude of the disturbance,

$$\frac{d|A|^2}{dt} = 2\sigma_r |A|^2 - l_r |A|^4,$$

which can also be re-written as

$$\frac{d|A|}{dt} = \sigma_r |A| -\frac{l_r}{2} |A|^3.$$

Similarly, the equation for the phase is given by

$$\frac{d\phi}{dt}= \sigma_i-\frac{l_i}{2} |A|^2.$$

For non-homogeneous systems, i.e., when $A$ depends on spatial coordinates, see Ginzburg–Landau equation. Due to the universality of the equation, the equation finds its application in many fields such as hydrodynamic stability, Belousov–Zhabotinsky reaction, etc.

== General solution ==
The Landau equation is linear when it is written for the dependent variable $|A|^{-2}$,

$$\frac{d|A|^{-2}}{dt} + 2\sigma_r |A|^{-2} = l_r.$$

The general solution for $\sigma_r\neq 0$ of the above equation is

$$|A(t)|^{-2} = \frac{l_r}{2\sigma_r} + \left(|A(0)|^{-2} - \frac{l_r}{2\sigma_r}\right)e^{-2\sigma_r t}.$$

As $t\rightarrow\infty$, the magnitude of the disturbance $|A|$ approaches a constant value that is independent of its initial value, i.e., $|A|_{\mathrm{max}}\rightarrow(2\sigma_r/l_r)^{1/2}$ when $t\gg 1/\sigma_r$. The above solution implies that $|A|$ does not have a real solution if $l_r<0$ and $\sigma_r>0$. The associated solution for the phase function $\phi(t)$ is given by

$$\phi(t)-\phi(0) = \sigma_i t - \frac{l_i}{2l_r} \ln \left[1+ \frac{|A(0)|^2l_r}{2\sigma_r}(e^{2\sigma_r t}-1)\right].$$

As $t\gg 1/\sigma_r$, the phase varies linearly with time, $\phi \sim (\sigma_i/\sigma_r-l_i/l_r)\sigma_rt.$

It is instructive to consider a hydrodynamic stability case where it is found that, according to the linear stability analysis, the flow is stable when $Re\leq Re_{\mathrm{cr}}$ and unstable otherwise, where $Re$ is the Reynolds number and the $Re_{\mathrm{cr}}$ is the critical Reynolds number; a familiar example that is applicable here is the critical Reynolds number, $Re_{\mathrm{cr}}\approx 50$, corresponding to the transition to Kármán vortex street in the problem of flow past a cylinder. The growth rate $\sigma_r$ is negative when $Re<Re_{\mathrm{cr}}$ and is positive when $Re>Re_{\mathrm{cr}}$ and therefore in the neighbourhood $Re\rightarrow Re_{\mathrm{cr}}$, it may written as $\sigma_r=\text{const}.\times (Re-Re_{\mathrm{cr}})$ wherein the constant is positive. Thus, the limiting amplitude is given by

$$|A|_{\mathrm{max}} \propto \sqrt{Re-Re_{\mathrm{cr}}}.$$

== Negative Landau constant ==
When the Landau constant is negative, $l_r<0$, we must include a negative term of higher order to arrest the unbounded increase of the perturbation. In this case, the Landau equation becomes

$$\frac{d|A|^2}{dt} = 2\sigma_r |A|^2 - l_r |A|^4 - \beta_r|A|^6, \quad \beta_r>0.$$

The limiting amplitude then becomes

$$|A|_{\mathrm{max}}\rightarrow   \frac{|l_r|}{2\beta_r} \pm \sqrt{\frac{l_r^2}{4\beta_r^2}+\frac{2|l_r|\sigma_r}{\beta_r}}, \quad \text{as} \quad t\gg 1/\sigma_r$$

where the plus sign corresponds to the stable branch and the minus sign to the unstable branch. There exists a value of a critical value $Re_{\mathrm{cr}}'$ where the above two roots are equal ($\sigma_r = -|l_r|/8\beta_r$) such that $Re_{\mathrm{cr}}'<Re_{\mathrm{cr}}$, indicating that the flow in the region $Re_{\mathrm{cr}}'<Re<Re_{\mathrm{cr}}$ is metastable, that is to say, in the metastable region, the flow is stable to infinitesimal perturbations, but not to finite amplitude perturbations.

== Coupled Stuart–Landau oscillators ==
When there are $N$ Stuart–Landau oscillators, the evolution is described by

$$\frac{dA_i}{dt} = \sigma_i A_i - \frac{l_i}{2} A_i |A_i|^2 + \sum_{j\neq i}K_{ij}A_j$$

where $K_{ij}$ defines the coupling-constant matrix.

== See also ==
- Landau's phase transition theory
- Ginzburg–Landau theory
