= Mason equation =

The Mason equation is an approximate analytical expression for the growth (due to condensation) or evaporation of a water droplet—it is due to the meteorologist B. J. Mason. The expression is found by recognising that mass diffusion towards the water drop in a supersaturated environment transports energy as latent heat, and this has to be balanced by the diffusion of sensible heat back across the boundary layer, (and the energy of heatup of the drop, but for a cloud-sized drop this last term is usually small).

== Equation ==
In Mason's formulation the changes in temperature across the boundary layer can be related to the changes in saturated vapour pressure by the Clausius–Clapeyron relation; the two energy transport terms must be nearly equal but opposite in sign and so this sets the interface temperature of the drop. The resulting expression for the growth rate is significantly lower than that expected if the drop were not warmed by the latent heat.

Thus if the drop has a size r, the inward mass flow rate is given by

$$\frac{dM}{dt} = 4 \pi r_{p} D_{v} (\rho_{0} - \rho_{w} ) \,$$

and the sensible heat flux by

$$\frac{dQ}{dt} = 4 \pi r_{p} K (T_{0} - T_{w}) \,$$

and the final expression for the growth rate is

$$r \frac{dr}{dt} = \frac {(S-1)} { [(L/RT-1) \cdot L \rho_l /K T_0 + (\rho_l R T_0)/ (D \rho_v) ]}$$

where

- S is the supersaturation far from the drop
- L is the latent heat
- K is the vapour thermal conductivity
- D is the binary diffusion coefficient
- R is the gas constant
