= Neugebauer equations =

The Neugebauer equations are a set of equations used to model color printing systems, developed by Hans E. J. Neugebauer. They were intended to predict the color produced by a combination of halftones printed in cyan, magenta, and yellow inks.

The equations estimate the reflectance (in CIE XYZ coordinates or as a function of wavelength) as a function of the reflectance of the 8 possible combinations of CMY inks (or the 16 combinations of CMYK inks), weighted by the area they take up on the paper. In wavelength form:

$$R(\lambda) = \sum_{i=1}^{16} w_i R_i(\lambda),$$

where R_{i}(λ) is the reflectance of ink combination i, and w_{i} is the relative proportions of the 16 colors in a uniformly colored patch. The weights are dependent on the halftone pattern and possibly subject to various forms of dot gain.

Light can interact with the paper and ink in more complex ways. The Yule–Nielsen correction takes into account light entering through blank regions and re-emerging through ink:

$$R(\lambda) = \left( \sum_{i=1}^{16} w_i R_i(\lambda)^\frac{1}{n} \right)^n.$$

The factor n would be 2 for a perfectly diffusing Lambertian paper substrate, but can be adjusted based on empirical measurements. Further considerations of the optics, such as multiple internal reflections, can be added at the price of additional complexity.

In order to achieve a desired reflectance, these equations have to be inverted to produce the actual dot areas or digital values sent to the printer, a nontrivial operation that may have multiple solutions.

== See also ==
- CMYK color model
