= Degasperis–Procesi equation =

Used in hydrology

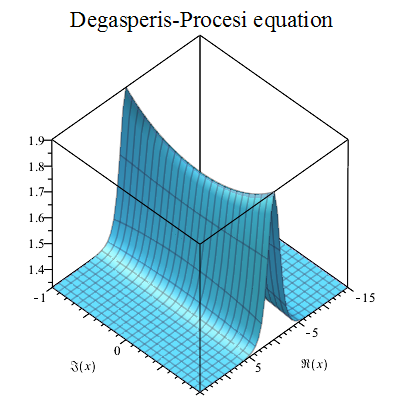
3-dimensional representation of Degasperis Procesi equation

In mathematical physics, the Degasperis–Procesi equation

$$\displaystyle u_t - u_{xxt} + 2\kappa u_x + 4u u_x = 3 u_x u_{xx} + u u_{xxx}$$

is one of only two exactly solvable equations in the following family of third-order, non-linear, dispersive PDEs:

$$\displaystyle u_t - u_{xxt} + 2\kappa u_x + (b+1)u u_x = b u_x u_{xx} + u u_{xxx},$$

where $\kappa$ and b are real parameters (b=3 for the Degasperis–Procesi equation). It was discovered by Antonio Degasperis and Michela Procesi in a search for integrable equations similar in form to the Camassa–Holm equation, which is the other integrable equation in this family (corresponding to b=2); that those two equations are the only integrable cases has been verified using a variety of different integrability tests. Although discovered solely because of its mathematical properties, the Degasperis–Procesi equation (with $\kappa > 0$) has later been found to play a similar role in water wave theory as the Camassa–Holm equation.

== Soliton solutions ==
Among the solutions of the Degasperis–Procesi equation (in the special case $\kappa=0$) are the so-called multipeakon solutions, which are functions of the form

$$\displaystyle u(x,t)=\sum_{i=1}^n m_i(t) e^{-|x-x_i(t)|}$$

where the functions $m_i$ and $x_i$ satisfy

$$\dot{x}_i = \sum_{j=1}^n m_j e^{-|x_i-x_j|},\qquad \dot{m}_i = 2 m_i \sum_{j=1}^n m_j\, \sgn{(x_i-x_j)} e^{-|x_i-x_j|}.$$

These ODEs can be solved explicitly in terms of elementary functions, using inverse spectral methods.

When $\kappa > 0$ the soliton solutions of the Degasperis–Procesi equation are smooth; they converge to peakons in the limit as $\kappa$ tends to zero.

== Discontinuous solutions ==
The Degasperis–Procesi equation (with $\kappa=0$) is formally equivalent to the (nonlocal) hyperbolic conservation law

$$\partial_t u + \partial_x \left[\frac{u^2}{2} + \frac{G}{2} * \frac{3 u^2}{2} \right] = 0,$$

where $G(x) = \exp(-|x|)$, and where the star denotes convolution with respect to x. In this formulation, it admits weak solutions with a very low degree of regularity, even discontinuous ones (shock waves). In contrast, the corresponding formulation of the Camassa–Holm equation contains a convolution involving both $u^2$ and $u_x^2$, which only makes sense if u lies in the Sobolev space $H^1 = W^{1,2}$ with respect to x. By the Sobolev embedding theorem, this means in particular that the weak solutions of the Camassa–Holm equation must be continuous with respect to x.
