= John Trevor Stuart =

British mathematician (1929–2023)

Trevor Stuart
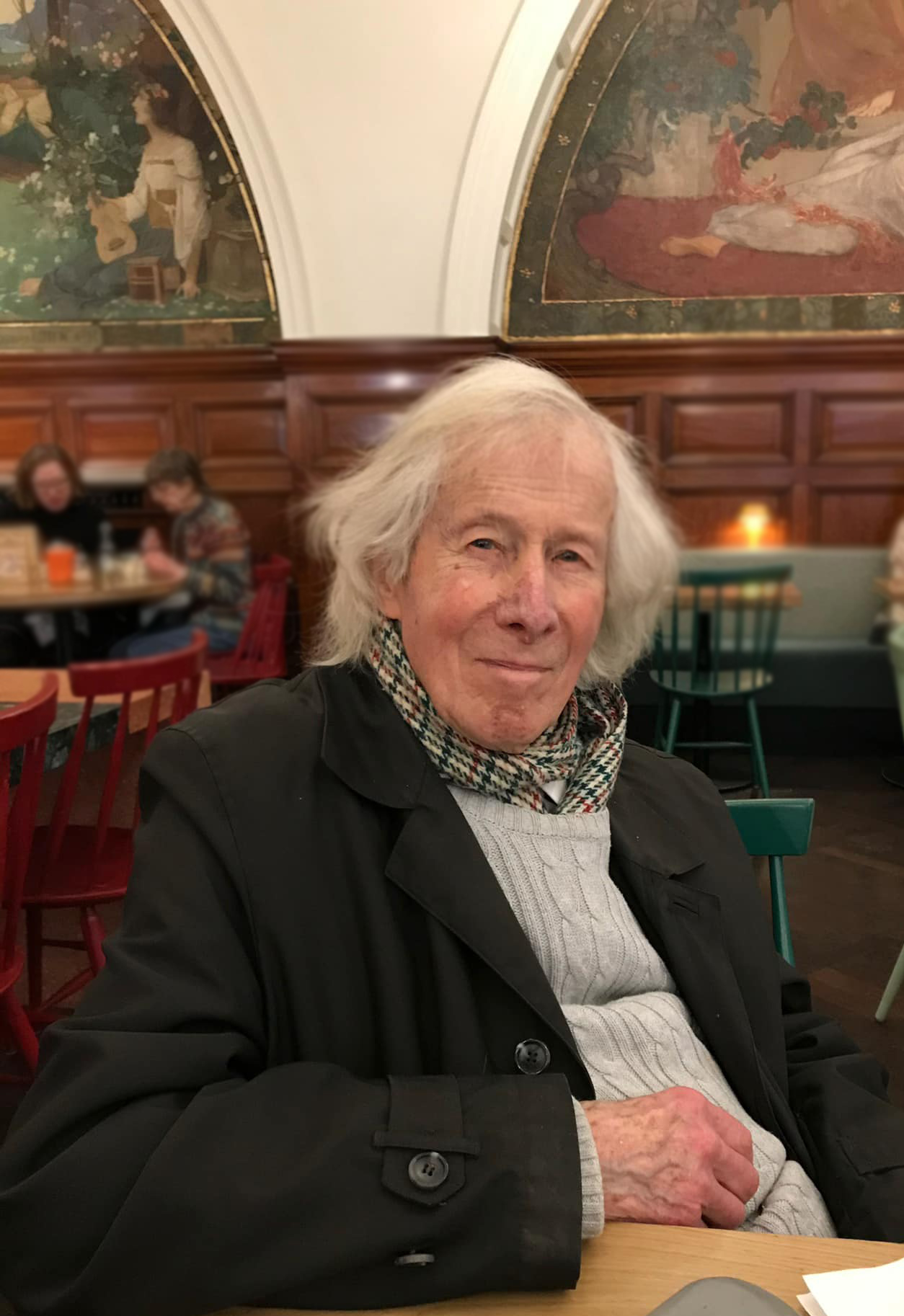
- Born: John Trevor Stuart; 29 January 1929; Leicester, England
- Died: 17 December 2023 (aged 94); London, England
- Education: Imperial College London
- Known for: Stuart number Stuart–Landau equation Complex Ginzburg–Landau equation Stuart vortex
- Awards: Fellow of the Royal Society (1974); Otto Laporte Award (1987); Senior Whitehead Prize (1984)
- Scientific career
- Fields: Fluid mechanics
- Workplaces: Imperial College London; Royal College of Science
- Thesis: Stability of viscous motion for finite disturbances (1952)
- Website: royalsociety.org/people/trevor-stuart-12364/

(John) Trevor Stuart FRS (29 January 1929 – 17 December 2023) was a mathematician and senior research investigator at Imperial College London working in theoretical fluid mechanics, hydrodynamic stability of fluid flows and nonlinear partial differential equations.

== Education ==
Stuart was educated Gateway Grammar School, Leicester and Imperial College of Science and Technology, London where he was awarded a Bachelor of Science degree in 1949. He continued his study at Imperial College and in 1953 was awarded a Ph.D. based on Stability of Viscous Motion for Finite Disturbances.

== Career ==
Stuart joined the Aeronautics Division of the National Research Laboratory, returning to join the staff of Imperial College after a few years. He was appointed professor of theoretical fluid mechanics in 1966 and was head of the Department of Mathematics from 1974 to 1979 and from 1983 to 1986. He was Dean of the Royal College of Science from 1990 to 1993. He was an emeritus professor at Imperial until he died in 2023.

== Research ==
Stuart is known for his work on nonlinear waves in the onset of turbulence in fluids. He also extended the work of Lord Rayleigh with research into steady streaming in unsteady viscous flows at high Reynolds numbers.

- 1978: (with R. C. Diprima) "The Eckhaus and Benjamin-Feir Resonance Mechanisms", Proceedings of the Royal Society A 362: 27, issue 1708, Bibcode:1978RSPSA.362...27S S2CID 119822941
- 1986: "Taylor-Vortex Flow: A Dynamical System", SIAM Review 28(3):315 342, Bibcode:1986SIAMR..28...10S, doi:10.1137/1028104
- 1995: (with M.R. Dhanak) "Distortion of the stagnation-point flow due to cross-stream vorticity in the external flow", Philosophical Transactions of the Royal Society A 352: 443, issue 1700, Bibcode:1995RSPTA.352..443D S2CID 120001341
- 1996: "Evolution of vorticity in perturbed flow in a pipe", Experimental Thermal and Fluid Science 13(3): 206 to 210, doi:10.1016/S0894-1777(96)00081-7
- 1997: "The quarterly journal of mechanics and applied mathematics 1947 to 1997", The Quarterly Journal of Mechanics and Applied Mathematics 50(4):497,8 doi:10.1093/qjmam/50.4.497
- 1998: "Singularities in three-dimensional Compressible Euler flows with vorticity", Theoretical and Computational Fluid Dynamics 10: 385–91, Bibcode:1998ThCFD..10..385S S2CID 121123133
- 2006: (with P.M.Eagles & R.C. Diprima) "The effects of eccentricity on torque and load in Taylor-vortex flow", Journal of Fluid Mechanics 87(2): 209 doi:10.1017/S002211207800155X S2CID 122036724

== Awards ==
Stuart was elected a Fellow of the Royal Society in 1974 and awarded the Otto Laporte Award in 1985 and the Senior Whitehead Prize in 1984. He also holds honorary Doctor of Science degrees from Brown University and the University of East Anglia. He was the editor of the Biographical Memoirs of Fellows of the Royal Society from 2012 to 2016.

== See also ==
- Stuart–Landau_equation
