= Hadamard–Rybczynski equation =

In fluid dynamics, the Hadamard–Rybczynski equation gives the terminal velocity of slowly moving spherical bubble through an ambient fluid. It is named after Jacques Hadamard and Witold Rybczyński:

$$W_\mathrm{b} = \frac{2}{3} \frac {R^2 g (\rho_\mathrm{b} - \rho_0)}{\mu_0}
\frac {\mu_0 + \mu_\mathrm{b}}{2\mu_0 + 3\mu_\mathrm{b}}$$

where

- $R$ is the radius of the bubble.
- $g$ the gravitational acceleration.
- $\rho_\mathrm{b}$ the density of the bubble.
- $\rho_0$ the density of the ambient fluid.
- $\mu_\mathrm{b}$ the viscosity of the bubble.
- $\mu_0$ the viscosity of the ambient fluid.
- $W_\mathrm{b}$ the resultant velocity of the bubble.

The Hadamard–Rybczynski equation can be derived from the Navier–Stokes equations by considering only the buoyancy force and drag force acting on the moving bubble. The surface tension force and inertia force of the bubble are neglected.
