= Pierre Henri Hugoniot =

French scientist (1851–1887)

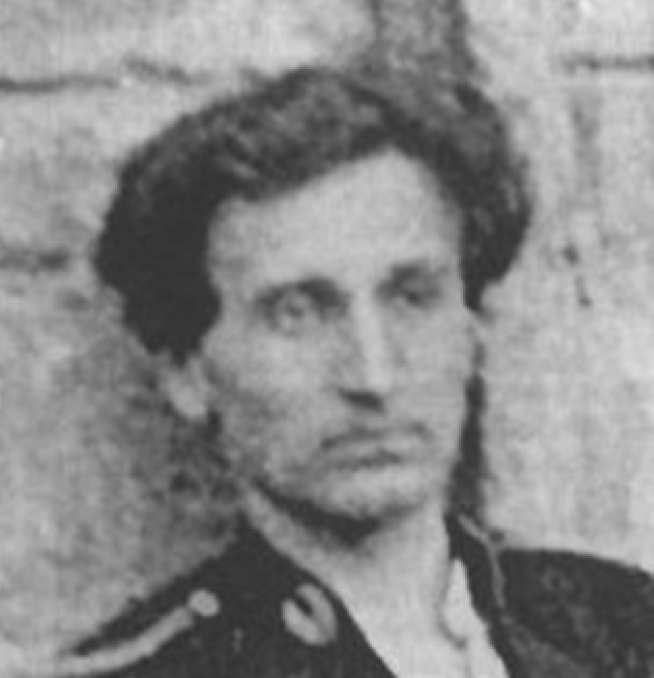
Image of Pierre-Henri Hugoniot

Pierre-Henri Hugoniot (French: [pjɛʁ ɑ̃ʁi yɡɔnjo]; born in Allenjoie, Doubs, France on 5 June 1851; died in Nantes, France in February 1887) was an inventor, mathematician, and physicist who worked on fluid mechanics, especially on issues related to material shock. He mostly lived in Montbéliard, (Franche-Comté).

After going into the marine artillery upon his graduation from the École Polytechnique in 1872, Hugoniot became professor of mechanics and ballistics at the School of Artillery Lorient (1879-1882) and Deputy Director of the Central Laboratory of the artillery Navy (1882-1884). He was promoted to captain in January 1884, and in April was appointed assistant professor of mechanical engineering at the École polytechnique. He conducted, along with his colleague Hippolyte Sébert (1839-1930), research on the trigger gas accompanying the detonation of a cannon.

He invented the theory based on conservation of mass, momentum, and energy, which allowed for improvements in fluid flow studies (with applications to aerospace). The Rankine–Hugoniot equation (or adiabatic dynamics of gas) has been named in his honor.

== Works ==
- Hugoniot (1887) "Mémoire sur la propagation du mouvement dans un fluide indéfini," Journal de Mathématiques pures et appliquées (4th series), vol. 3, pages 477-492 and vol. 4, pages 153-168.
- Hugoniot (1887). "Sur la propagation du mouvement dans les corps et spécialement dans les gaz parfaits (première partie)". Journal de l'École Polytechnique (in French). 57: 3–97.
- Hugoniot (1889). "Sur la propagation du mouvement dans les corps et spécialement dans les gaz parfaits (deuxième partie)". Journal de l'École Polytechnique (in French). 58: 1–125.
