= List of Laplace transforms =

The following is a list of Laplace transforms for many common functions of a single variable. The Laplace transform is an integral transform that takes a function of a positive real variable t (often time) to a function of a complex variable s (complex angular frequency).

== Properties ==
The Laplace transform of a function $f(t)$ can be obtained using the formal definition of the Laplace transform. However, some properties of the Laplace transform can be used to obtain the Laplace transform of some functions more easily.

=== Linearity ===
For functions $f$ and $g$ and for scalar $a$, the Laplace transform satisfies

$$\mathcal{L}\{a f(t) + b g(t)\}  = a \mathcal{L}\{f(t)\} + b \mathcal{L}\{ g(t)\}$$

and is, therefore, regarded as a linear operator.

=== Time shifting ===
The Laplace transform of $f(t - a) u(t - a)$, where $u$ is the Heaviside step function, is $e^{-as} F(s)$.

=== Frequency shifting ===
The Laplace transform of $e^{at} f(t)$ is $F(s - a)$.

== Explanatory notes ==
The unilateral Laplace transform takes as input a function whose time domain is the non-negative reals, which is why all of the time domain functions in the table below are multiples of the Heaviside step function, u(t).

The entries of the table that involve a time delay τ are required to be causal (meaning that τ > 0). A causal system is a system where the impulse response h(t) is zero for all time t prior to t = 0. In general, the region of convergence for causal systems is not the same as that of anticausal systems.

The following functions and variables are used in the table below:

- δ represents the Dirac delta function.
- u(t) represents the Heaviside step function. Literature may refer to this by other notation, including $1(t)$ or $H(t)$.
- Γ(z) represents the Gamma function.
- γ is the Euler–Mascheroni constant.
- t is a real number. It typically represents time, although it can represent any independent dimension.
- s is the complex frequency domain parameter, and Re(s) is its real part.
- n is an integer.
- α, τ, and ω are real numbers.
- q is a complex number.

== Table ==
Function	Time domain $f(t) = \mathcal{L}^{-1}\{F(s)\}$	Laplace s-domain $F(s) = \mathcal{L}\{f(t)\}$	Region of convergence	Reference
unit impulse	$\delta(t)$	$1$	all s	inspection
delayed impulse	$\delta(t - \tau)$	$e^{-\tau s}$	Re(s) > 0	time shift of unit impulse
unit step	$u(t)$	${ 1 \over s }$	Re(s) > 0	integrate unit impulse
delayed unit step	$u(t - \tau)$	$\frac{1}{s} e^{-\tau s}$	Re(s) > 0	time shift of unit step
ramp	$t \cdot u(t)$	$\frac{1}{s^2}$	Re(s) > 0	integrate unit impulse twice
nth power (for integer n)	$t^n \cdot u(t)$	${ n! \over s^{n + 1} }$	Re(s) > 0 (n > −1)	Integrate unit step n times
qth power (for complex q)	$t^q \cdot u(t)$	${ \operatorname{\Gamma}(q + 1) \over s^{q + 1} }$	Re(s) > 0 Re(q) > −1	
nth root	$\sqrt[n]{t} \cdot u(t)$	${ 1 \over s^{\frac{1}{n}+1} } \operatorname{\Gamma}\left(\frac{1}{n} + 1\right)$	Re(s) > 0	Set q = 1/n above.
nth power with frequency shift	$t^{n} e^{-\alpha t} \cdot u(t)$	$\frac{n!}{(s+\alpha)^{n+1}}$	Re(s) > −α	Integrate unit step, apply frequency shift
delayed nth power with frequency shift	$(t-\tau)^n e^{-\alpha (t-\tau)} \cdot u(t-\tau)$	$\frac{n! \cdot e^{-\tau s}}{(s+\alpha)^{n+1}}$	Re(s) > −α	Integrate unit step, apply frequency shift, apply time shift
exponential decay	$e^{-\alpha t} u(t)$	${ 1 \over s+\alpha }$	Re(s) > −α	Frequency shift of unit step
two-sided exponential decay (only for bilateral transform)	$e^{-\alpha|t|}$	${ 2\alpha \over \alpha^2 - s^2 }$	−α < Re(s) < α	Frequency shift of unit step
exponential approach	$( 1-e^{-\alpha t}) \cdot u(t)$	$\frac{\alpha}{s(s+\alpha)}$	Re(s) > 0	Unit step minus exponential decay
sine	$\sin(\omega t) \cdot u(t)$	${ \omega \over s^2 + \omega^2 }$	Re(s) > 0	
cosine	$\cos(\omega t) \cdot u(t)$	${ s \over s^2 + \omega^2 }$	Re(s) > 0	
hyperbolic sine	$\sinh(\alpha t) \cdot u(t)$	${ \alpha \over s^2 - \alpha^2 }$	Re(s) > |α|	
hyperbolic cosine	$\cosh(\alpha t) \cdot u(t)$	${ s \over s^2 - \alpha^2 }$	Re(s) > |α|	
exponentially decaying sine wave	$e^{-\alpha t} \sin(\omega t) \cdot u(t)$	${ \omega \over (s+\alpha )^2 + \omega^2 }$	Re(s) > −α	
exponentially decaying cosine wave	$e^{-\alpha t} \cos(\omega t) \cdot u(t)$	${ s+\alpha \over (s+\alpha )^2 + \omega^2 }$	Re(s) > −α	
natural logarithm	$\ln (t) \cdot u(t)$	$\frac{-\ln(s)-\gamma}{s}$	Re(s) > 0	
Bessel function of the first kind, of order n	$J_n( \omega t) \cdot u(t)$	$\frac{ \left(\sqrt{s^2 + \omega^2}-s\right)^{\!n}}{\omega^n \sqrt{s^2 + \omega^2}}$	Re(s) > 0 (n > −1)	
Error function	$\operatorname{erf}(t) \cdot u(t)$	$\frac{e^{s^2/4}}{s} \!\left(1 - \operatorname{erf} \left(\frac{s}{2}\right)\right)$	Re(s) > 0	

== See also ==
- List of Fourier transforms
