= Gerald B. Whitham =

American mathematician (1927–2014)

Gerald Beresford Whitham
- Born: 13 December 1927; Halifax, West Yorkshire
- Died: 26 January 2014 (aged 86)
- Education: University of Manchester
- Known for: Wave action Whitham equation Averaged Lagrangian
- Awards: Norbert Wiener Prize (1980)
- Scientific career
- Fields: Applied mathematics
- Workplaces: California Institute of Technology; Massachusetts Institute of Technology
- Doctoral advisor: James Lighthill

Gerald Beresford Whitham FRS (13 December 1927 – 26 January 2014) was a British–born American applied mathematician and the Charles Lee Powell Professor of Applied Mathematics (Emeritus) of Applied & Computational Mathematics at the California Institute of Technology. He received his Ph.D. from the University of Manchester in 1953 under the direction of Sir James Lighthill. He is known for his work in fluid dynamics and waves.

== Academic career ==
Whitham was born in Halifax, West Yorkshire. He received his Ph.D. from University of Manchester in 1953. He was a Faculty Member in the Department of Mathematics at the Massachusetts Institute of Technology during 1959–1962. He left MIT to join California Institute of Technology, Pasadena, California where he was instrumental in setting up the applied mathematics program in 1962.

== Honors and awards ==
Whitham is a Fellow of the American Academy of Arts and Sciences since 1959. In 1965, Whitham was elected a Fellow of the Royal Society.

Whitham received the Norbert Wiener Prize in Applied Mathematics in 1980, jointly awarded by the Society for Industrial and Applied Mathematics (SIAM) and the American Mathematical Society (AMS). This prize was awarded "for an outstanding contribution to applied mathematics in the highest and broadest sense." Whitham was honored "for his broad contributions to the understanding of fluid dynamical phenomena and his innovative contributions to the methodology through which that understanding can be constructed".

== Selected articles ==
=== Articles ===
- Whitham, G. B. (1952). "The flow pattern of a supersonic projectile". Communications on Pure and Applied Mathematics. 5 (3): 301–348. doi:10.1002/cpa.3160050305.
- Whitham, G. B. (1954). "A note on a paper by G. C. McVittie". Quarterly of Applied Mathematics. 12 (3): 316–318. doi:10.1090/qam/63835. MR 0063835. (See George C. McVittie.)
- Lighthill, M. J.; Whitham, G. B. (1955). "On kinematic waves I. Flood movement in long rivers". Proceedings of the Royal Society of London. Series A. Mathematical and Physical Sciences. 229 (1178): 281–316. Bibcode:1955RSPSA.229..281L. doi:10.1098/rspa.1955.0088. S2CID 18301080.
- Lighthill, M. J.; Whitham, G. B. (1955). "On kinematic waves II. A theory of traffic flow on long crowded roads". Proceedings of the Royal Society of London. Series A. Mathematical and Physical Sciences. 229 (1178): 317–345. Bibcode:1955RSPSA.229..317L. doi:10.1098/rspa.1955.0089. S2CID 15210652.
- Whitham, G. B. (1965). "Non-linear dispersive waves". Proceedings of the Royal Society of London. Series A. Mathematical and Physical Sciences. 283 (1393): 238–261. Bibcode:1965RSPSA.283..238W. doi:10.1098/rspa.1965.0019. S2CID 123343879.
- Whitham, G. B. (1965). "A general approach to linear and non-linear dispersive waves using a Lagrangian". Journal of Fluid Mechanics. 22 (2): 273–283. Bibcode:1965JFM....22..273W. doi:10.1017/S0022112065000745. S2CID 122565447.
- Seliger, R. L.; Whitham, G. B. (1968). "Variational principles in continuum mechanics". Proceedings of the Royal Society of London. Series A. Mathematical and Physical Sciences. 305 (1480): 1–25. Bibcode:1968RSPSA.305....1S. doi:10.1098/rspa.1968.0103. ISSN 2053-9169. S2CID 119565234.
- Fornberg, B.; Whitham, G. B. (1978). "A Numerical and Theoretical Study of Certain Nonlinear Wave Phenomena". Philosophical Transactions of the Royal Society A: Mathematical, Physical and Engineering Sciences. 289 (1361): 373–404. Bibcode:1978RSPTA.289..373F. doi:10.1098/rsta.1978.0064. S2CID 7333207.

=== Books ===
- G. B. Whitham, Linear and Nonlinear Waves, John Wiley & Sons (1974).
