= Nigel Mason =

British physicist

Nigel John Mason OBE
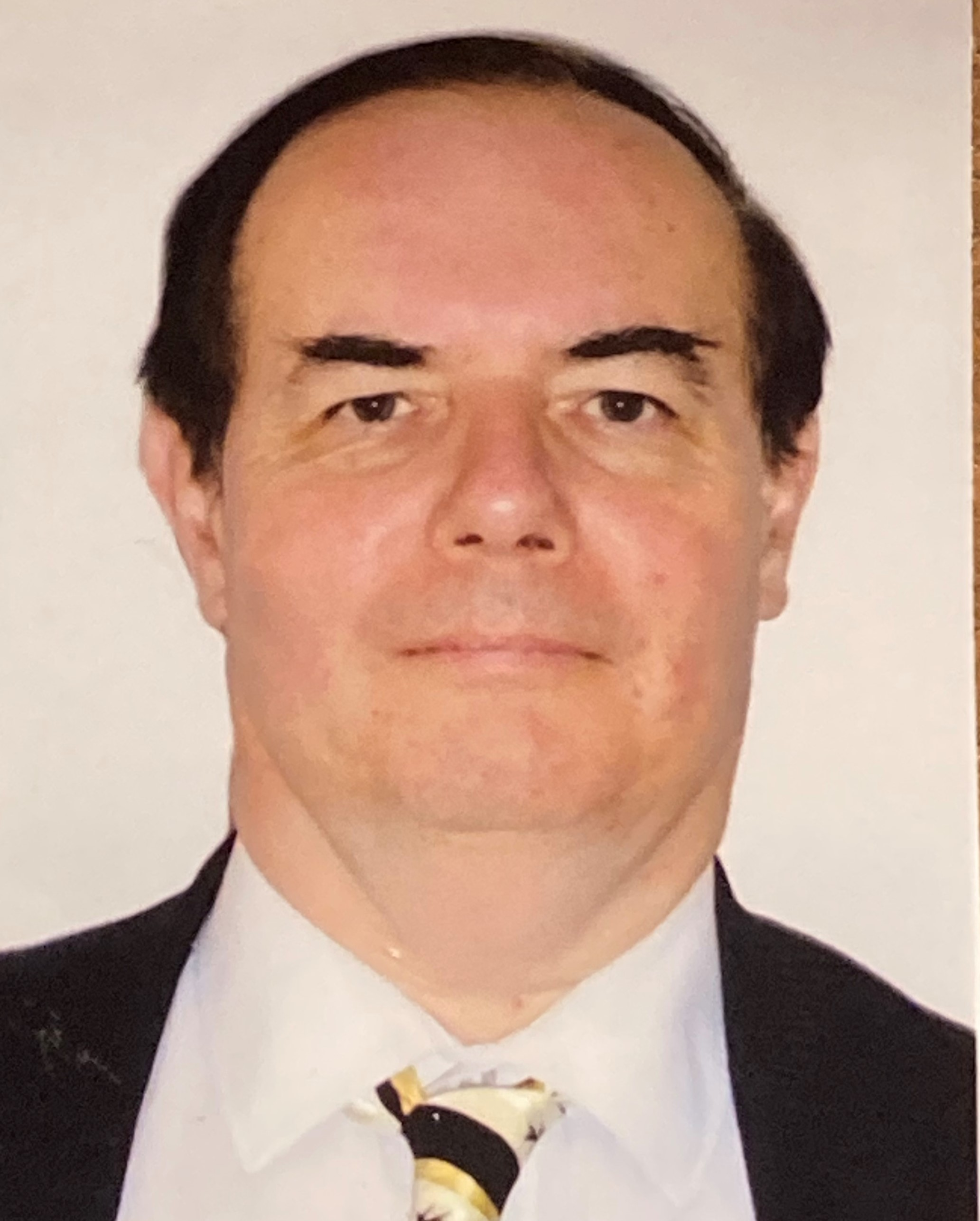
- Mason in 2026
- Scientific career
- Fields: Molecular physics, astrochemistry, planetary science
- Workplaces: University of Kent; ATOMKI; Open University; University College London

Nigel John Mason OBE is a British molecular physicist and Professor of Molecular Physics at the University of Kent in Canterbury, England. His research concerns electron- and photon-induced processes in atoms and molecules, particularly molecular fragmentation and the chemical reactivity that follows, with applications ranging across astrochemistry, atmospheric science, plasma physics, nanotechnology, planetary science and radiation science.

== Early life and education ==
Mason studied physics at University College London (UCL), where he graduated with a First Class BSc in 1983 and completed a PhD in 1987. In 2002, he was awarded a DSc by the University of London.

== Career ==
Mason began his research career at UCL, where his doctoral and early postdoctoral work examined the simultaneous absorption of energy from photons and electrons by atoms. A Royal Society University Research Fellowship, which he held from 1990 to 1998, allowed him to establish the Molecular Physics Group at UCL.

In 2002–03 he moved to the Open University as Professor of Molecular Physics, and from 2009 to 2014 served as Associate Dean for Research, Enterprise and Scholarship in its Faculty of Science. He joined the University of Kent in September 2018 as Head of the School of Physical Sciences, continuing to hold the title Professor of Molecular Physics.

== Research ==
Mason's research centres on fundamental molecular-physics processes, especially the fragmentation of molecules by low-energy electrons and photons and the chemical reactions that follow. He has applied this work to molecular processes in interstellar and planetary environments, atmospheric chemistry, plasma physics and nanolithography, as well as to radiation damage in biomolecular systems, where his studies of radiation effects have informed research on ion-beam radiotherapy and nanoparticle radiosensitisers.

Much of this work depends on reliable atomic and molecular reference data. Mason has been a member of the Virtual Atomic and Molecular Data Centre (VAMDC) consortium since its launch in 2009.

== Scientific leadership ==
Between 2019 and 2023, Mason was President of the Europlanet Society, a European organisation supporting planetary-science research and its infrastructure. In January 2023 he became a founder and the inaugural President of Europlanet AISBL, the international non-profit association that provides the legal framework for Europlanet's activities, including the Europlanet Society. Alongside these roles he serves as Chief Scientific Advisor to the Institute for Nuclear Physics at ATOMKI in Debrecen, Hungary, and chairs the Sir John Mason Academic Trust, which he established in honour of his father to support academic collaboration in atomic and molecular physics. He is an Honorary Professor at the University of Innsbruck and a Fellow of the Institute of Physics, the Royal Society of Chemistry and the Royal Astronomical Society.

== Honours ==
Mason was appointed an Officer of the Order of the British Empire in the 2007 Birthday Honours for services to science, then holding a chair at the Open University. In 2022 Comenius University in Bratislava awarded him its Gold Medal, recognising his research on the interactions of electrons with atoms and molecules — with particular relevance to plasma physics and astrophysics — and his long-standing collaboration with the university.
