= Hunter–Saxton equation =

Partial differential equation

In mathematical physics, the Hunter–Saxton equation

$$(u_t + u u_x)_x = \frac{1}{2} \, u_x^2$$

is an integrable PDE that arises in the theoretical study of nematic liquid crystals. If the molecules in the liquid crystal are initially all aligned, and some of them are then wiggled slightly, this disturbance in orientation will propagate through the crystal, and the Hunter–Saxton equation describes certain aspects of such orientation waves.

== Physical background ==
In the models for liquid crystals considered here, it is assumed that there is no fluid flow, so that only the orientation of the molecules is of interest. Within the elastic continuum theory, the orientation is described by a field of unit vectors n(x,y,z,t). For nematic liquid crystals, there is no difference between orienting a molecule in the n direction or in the −n direction, and the vector field n is then called a director field. The potential energy density of a director field is usually assumed to be given by the Oseen–Frank energy functional

$$W(\mathbf{n},\nabla\mathbf{n})
= \frac12 \left(
\alpha (\nabla \cdot \mathbf{n})^2
+ \beta (\mathbf{n} \cdot (\nabla \times \mathbf{n}))^2
+ \gamma | \mathbf{n} \times (\nabla \times \mathbf{n})|^2
\right),$$

where the positive coefficients $\alpha$, $\beta$, $\gamma$ are known as the elastic coefficients of splay, twist, and bend, respectively. The kinetic energy is often neglected because of the high viscosity of liquid crystals.

== Derivation of the Hunter–Saxton equation ==
Hunter and Saxton investigated the case when viscous damping is ignored and a kinetic energy term is included in the model. Then the governing equations for the dynamics of the director field are the Euler–Lagrange equations for the Lagrangian

$$\mathcal{L} =
\frac{1}{2} \left| \frac{\partial\mathbf{n}}{\partial t} \right|^2
- W(\mathbf{n},\nabla\mathbf{n})
- \frac{\lambda}{2} (1-|\mathbf{n}|^2),$$

where $\lambda$ is a Lagrange multiplier corresponding to the constraint |n|=1. They restricted their attention to "splay waves" where the director field takes the special form

$$\mathbf{n}(x,y,z,t) = (\cos\varphi(x,t), \sin\varphi(x,t), 0).$$

This assumption reduces the Lagrangian to

$$\mathcal{L} = \frac{1}{2} \left(
\varphi_t^2 - a^2(\varphi) \varphi_x^2
\right),
\qquad
a(\varphi) := \sqrt{\alpha \sin^2 \varphi + \gamma \cos^2 \varphi},$$

and then the Euler–Lagrange equation for the angle φ becomes

$$\varphi_{tt} = a(\varphi) [a(\varphi) \varphi_x]_x.$$

There are trivial constant solutions φ=φ_{0} corresponding to states where the molecules in the liquid crystal are perfectly aligned. Linearization around such an equilibrium leads to the linear wave equation which allows wave propagation in both directions with speed $a_0 := a(\varphi_0)$, so the nonlinear equation can be expected to behave similarly. In order to study right-moving waves for large t, one looks for asymptotic solutions of the form

$$\varphi(x,t;\epsilon) =
\varphi_0 + \epsilon \varphi_1(\theta,\tau) + O(\epsilon^2),$$

where

$$\theta := x-a_0 t, \qquad \tau := \epsilon t.$$

Inserting this into the equation, one finds at the order $\epsilon^2$ that

$$(\varphi_{1\tau} + a'(\varphi_0) \varphi_1 \varphi_{1\theta})_{\theta}
= \frac{1}{2} a'(\varphi_0) \varphi_{1\theta}^2.$$

A simple renaming and rescaling of the variables (assuming that $a'(\varphi_0) \neq 0$) transforms this into the Hunter–Saxton equation.

=== Generalization ===
The analysis was later generalized by Alì and Hunter, who allowed the director field to point in any direction, but with the spatial dependence still only in the x direction:

$$\mathbf{n}(x,y,z,t) = (\cos\varphi(x,t), \sin\varphi(x,t) \cos\psi(x,t), \sin\varphi(x,t) \sin\psi(x,t)).$$

Then the Lagrangian is

$$\mathcal{L} = \frac{1}{2} \left(
\varphi_t^2 - a^2(\varphi) \varphi_x^2
+ \sin^2 \varphi \left[ \psi_t^2 - b^2(\varphi) \psi_x^2 \right]
\right),$$

where

$$a(\varphi) := \sqrt{\alpha \sin^2 \varphi + \gamma \cos^2 \varphi},
\quad
b(\varphi) := \sqrt{\beta \sin^2 \varphi + \gamma \cos^2 \varphi}.$$

The corresponding Euler–Lagrange equations are coupled nonlinear wave equations for the angles φ and ψ, with φ corresponding to "splay waves" and ψ to "twist waves". The previous Hunter–Saxton case (pure splay waves) is recovered by taking ψ constant, but one can also consider coupled splay-twist waves where both φ and ψ vary. Asymptotic expansions similar to that above lead to a system of equations, which, after renaming and rescaling the variables, takes the form

$$(v_t + u v_x)_x = 0, \qquad u_{xx} = v_x^2,$$

where u is related to φ and v to ψ. This system implies that u satisfies

$$\left[ (u_t + u u_x)_x - \frac{1}{2} \, u_x^2 \right]_x = 0,$$

so (rather remarkably) the Hunter–Saxton equation arises in this context too, but in a different way.

== Variational structures and integrability ==
The integrability of the Hunter–Saxton equation, or, more precisely, that of its x derivative

$$(u_t + u u_x)_{xx} = u_x u_{xx},$$

was shown by Hunter and Zheng, who exploited that this equation is obtained from the Camassa–Holm equation

$$u_t - u_{xxt} + 3 u u_x = 2 u_x u_{xx} + u u_{xxx}$$

in the "high frequency limit"

$$(x,t) \mapsto (\epsilon x, \epsilon t), \qquad \epsilon \to 0.$$

Applying this limiting procedure to a Lagrangian for the Camassa–Holm equation, they obtained a Lagrangian

$$\mathcal{L}_2 = \frac{1}{2} u_x^2 + w (v_t + u v_x)$$

which produces the Hunter–Saxton equation after elimination of v and w from the Euler–Lagrange equations for u, v, w. Since there is also the more obvious Lagrangian

$$\mathcal{L}_1 = u_x u_t + u u_x^2,$$

the Hunter–Saxton has two inequivalent variational structures. Hunter and Zheng also obtained a bihamiltonian formulation and a Lax pair from the corresponding structures for the Camassa–Holm equation in a similar way.

The fact that the Hunter–Saxton equation arises physically in two different ways (as shown above) was used by Alì and Hunter to explain why it has this bivariational (or bihamiltonian) structure.

== Geometric formulation ==
The periodic Hunter-Saxton equation can be given a geometric interpretation as the geodesic equation on an infinite-dimensional Lie group, endowed with an appropriate Riemannian metric. In more detail, consider the group $\mathrm{Diff}(S^1)$ of diffeomorphisms of the unit circle $S^1$. Choose some $x_0\in S^1$ and denote by $G$ the subgroup of $\mathrm{Diff}(S^1)$ consisting diffeomorphisms which fix $x_0$:

$$G=\{\varphi\in\mathrm{Diff}(S^1) \mid \varphi(x_0)=x_0\}.$$

The group $G$ is an infinite-dimensional Lie group, whose Lie algebra consists of vector fields on $S^1$ which vanish at $x_0$:

$$\mathfrak{g}=\left\{ u\frac{\partial}{\partial x} \ \bigg\vert \  u(x_0)=0\right\}.$$

Here $x$ is the standard coordinate on $S^1$. Endow $\mathfrak{g}$ with the homogeneous $\dot H^1$ inner product:

$$\left\langle u\frac{\partial}{\partial x},v\frac{\partial}{\partial x}\right\rangle_{\dot H^1}:=\int_{S^1}u_xv_xdx,$$

where the subscript denotes differentiation. This inner product defines a right-invariant Riemannian metric on $G$ (on the full group $\mathrm{Diff}(S^1)$ this is only a semi-metric, since constant vector fields have norm 0 with respect to $\dot H^1$. Note that $G$ is isomorphic to the right quotient of $\mathrm{Diff}(S^1)$ by the subgroup of translations, which is generated by constant vector fields).

Let

$$U(x,t)=u(x,t)\frac{\partial}{\partial x}$$

be a time-dependent vector field on $S^1$ such that $U(\cdot,t)\in\mathfrak{g}$ for all $t$, and let $\{\varphi_t\}$ be the flow of $U$, i.e. the solution to:

$$\frac{d}{dt}\varphi_t(x)=u(\varphi_t(x),t).$$

Then $u$ is a periodic solution to the Hunter-Saxton equation if and only if the path $t\mapsto\varphi_t\in G$ is a geodesic on $G$ with respect to the right-invariant $\dot H^1$ metric.

In the non-periodic case, one can similarly construct a subgroup of the group of diffeomorphisms of the real line, with a Riemannian metric whose geodesics correspond to non-periodic solutions of the Hunter-Saxton equation with appropriate decay conditions at infinity.

== See also ==
- Euler–Arnold equation
