= Ramanujan–Nagell equation =

Type of Diophantine equation in number theory

In number theory, the Ramanujan–Nagell equation is an equation between a square number and a number that is seven less than a power of two. It is an example of an exponential Diophantine equation, an equation to be solved in integers where one of the variables appears as an exponent.

The equation is named after Srinivasa Ramanujan, who conjectured that it has only five integer solutions, and after Trygve Nagell, who proved the conjecture. It implies non-existence of perfect binary codes with the minimum Hamming distance 5 or 6.

== Equation and solution ==
The equation is

$$2^n-7=x^2 \,$$

and solutions in natural numbers n and x exist just when n = 3, 4, 5, 7 and 15 (sequence A060728 in the OEIS).

This was conjectured in 1913 by Indian mathematician Srinivasa Ramanujan, proposed independently in 1943 by the Norwegian mathematician Wilhelm Ljunggren, and proved in 1948 by the Norwegian mathematician Trygve Nagell. The values of n correspond to the values of x as:-

x = 1, 3, 5, 11 and 181 (sequence A038198 in the OEIS).

== Triangular Mersenne numbers ==
The problem of finding all numbers of the form 2^{b} − 1 (Mersenne numbers) which are triangular is equivalent:

$$\begin{align}
& \ 2^b-1 = \frac{y(y+1)}{2} \\[2pt]
\Longleftrightarrow & \ 8(2^b-1) = 4y(y+1) \\
\Longleftrightarrow & \ 2^{b+3}-8 = 4y^2+4y \\
\Longleftrightarrow & \ 2^{b+3}-7 = 4y^2+4y+1 \\
\Longleftrightarrow & \ 2^{b+3}-7 = (2y+1)^2
\end{align}$$

The values of b are just those of n − 3, and the corresponding triangular Mersenne numbers (also known as Ramanujan–Nagell numbers) are:

$$\frac{y(y+1)}{2} = \frac{(x-1)(x+1)}{8}$$

for x = 1, 3, 5, 11 and 181, giving 0, 1, 3, 15, 4095 and no more (sequence A076046 in the OEIS).

== Equations of Ramanujan–Nagell type ==
An equation of the form

$$x^2 + D = A B^n$$

for fixed D, A, B and variable x, n is said to be of Ramanujan–Nagell type. The result of Siegel implies that the number of solutions in each case is finite. By representing $n = 3m + r$ with $r\in\{0,1,2\}$ and $B^n = B^r y^3$ with $y=B^m$, the equation of Ramanujan–Nagell type is reduced to three Mordell curves (indexed by $r$), each of which has a finite number of integer solutions:

$$r=0:\qquad (Ax)^2 = (Ay)^3 - A^2D$$,
$$r=1:\qquad (ABx)^2 = (ABy)^3 - A^2B^2D$$,
$$r=2:\qquad (AB^2x)^2 = (AB^2y)^3 - A^2B^4D$$.

The equation with $A=1,\ B=2,\ D>0$ has at most two solutions, except in the case $D=7$ corresponding to the Ramanujan–Nagell equation. This does not hold for $D<0$, such as $D=-17$, where $x^2 - 17 = 2^n$ has the four solutions $(x,n) = (5,3),(7,5),(9,6),(23,9)$. In general, if $D=-(4^k-3\cdot2^{k+1}+1)$ for an integer $k\geqslant3$ there are at least the four solutions

$$(x,n) = \begin{cases}(2^k-3,3)\\(2^k-1,k+2)\\(2^k+1,k+3)\\(3\cdot2^k-1,2k+3)\end{cases}$$

and these are the only four if $D>-10^{12}$. There are infinitely many values of D for which there are exactly two solutions, including $D = 2^m - 1$.

== Equations of Lebesgue–Nagell type ==
An equation of the form

$$x^2 + D = A y^n$$

for fixed D, A and variable x, y, n, where n > 2, is said to be of Lebesgue–Nagell type. This is named after Victor-Amédée Lebesgue, who proved that the equation

$$x^2 + 1 = y^n$$

has no nontrivial solutions.

Results of Shorey and Tijdeman imply that the number of solutions in each case is finite. Bugeaud, Mignotte and Siksek solved equations of this type with A = 1 and 1 ≤ D ≤ 100. In particular, the following generalization of the Ramanujan–Nagell equation:

$$y^n=x^2+7 \,$$

has positive integer solutions only when x = 1, 3, 5, 11, or 181.

== See also ==
- Pillai's conjecture
- Scientific equations named after people
