= Swift–Hohenberg equation =

Partial differential equation

The Swift–Hohenberg equation (named after Jack B. Swift and Pierre Hohenberg) is a partial differential equation noted for its pattern-forming behaviour. It takes the form

$$\frac{\partial u}{\partial t} = r u - (1+\nabla^2)^2u + N(u)$$

where u = u(x, t) or u = u(x, y, t) is a scalar function defined on the line or the plane, r is a real bifurcation parameter, and N(u) is some smooth nonlinearity.

The equation is named after the authors of the paper, where it was derived from the equations for thermal convection.

Another example where the equation appears is in the study of wrinkling morphology and pattern selection in curved elastic bilayer materials.

The Swift–Hohenberg equation leads to the Ginzburg–Landau equation.

== See also ==
- Dissipative soliton#Theoretical description
- Reaction–diffusion system
- Turing patterns
- Rayleigh–Bénard convection
