= Zakharov–Schulman system =

System of nonlinear partial differential equations

In mathematics, the Zakharov–Schulman system is a system of nonlinear partial differential equations introduced in Zakharov & Schulman (1980) to describe the interactions of small amplitude, high frequency waves with acoustic waves. The equations are

$$i\partial_t^{} u + L_1u = \phi u$$
$$L_2 \phi = L_3( | u |^2)$$

where L_{1}, L_{2}, and L_{3}, are constant coefficient differential operators.
