= Trygve Nagell =

Norwegian mathematician (1895–1988)

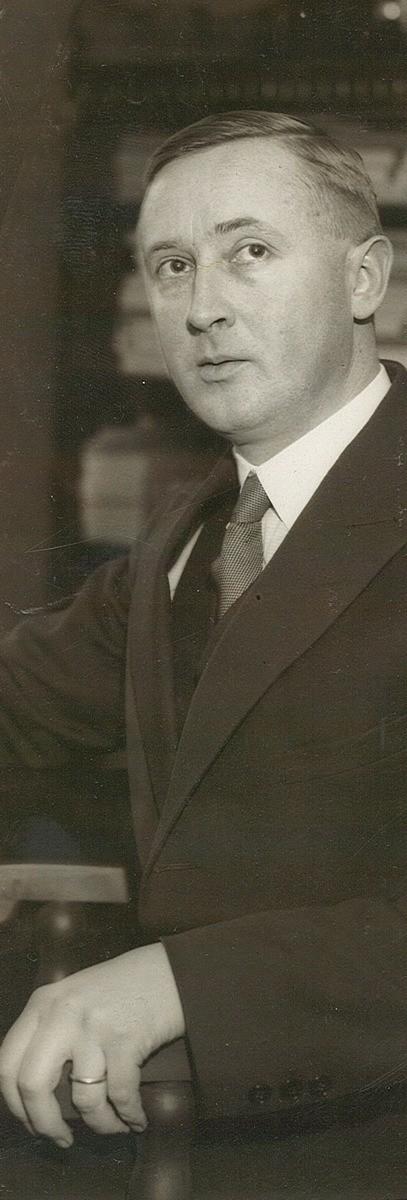
- Trygve Nagell in the 1930s.
- Born: 13 July 1895; Kristiania, Norway
- Died: 24 January 1988 (aged 92); Uppsala, Sweden
- Citizenship: Norwegian
- Occupation: mathematician

Trygve Nagell or Trygve Nagel (13 July 1895 – 24 January 1988) was a Norwegian mathematician, known for his works on Diophantine equations in number theory. He was born in Oslo and died in Uppsala.

== Education and career ==
He was born Nagel and adopted the spelling Nagell later in life. He received his doctorate at the University of Oslo in 1926, where his advisor was Axel Thue. He continued to lecture at the University until 1931. He was a professor at the University of Uppsala from 1931 to 1962. His doctoral students include Harald Bergström.

== Contributions ==
Nagell proved a conjecture of Srinivasa Ramanujan that there are only five numbers that are both triangular numbers and Mersenne numbers. They are the numbers 0, 1, 3, 15, and 4095. The formula expressing the equality of a triangular number and a Mersenne number can be simplified to the equivalent form

$$2^n-7=x^2,$$

which likewise has five solutions in natural numbers $n$ and $x$, with solutions for $n \in\{ 3, 4, 5, 7, 15 \}$. In honor of Nagell's solution, this equation is called the Ramanujan–Nagell equation.

The Nagell–Lutz theorem is a result in the Diophantine geometry of elliptic curves, which describes rational torsion points on elliptic curves over the integers. It was published independently by Nagell and by Élisabeth Lutz.

In 1952, Nagell independently formulated the torsion conjecture for elliptic curves over the rationals after it was originally formulated by Beppo Levi in 1908.

== Awards and honors ==
Nagell was appointed Commander of the Royal Norwegian Order of St. Olav in 1951, and of the Swedish Order of the Polar Star in 1952.
