= Camaso =

Camaso is a surname. Notable people with the surname include:

- Claudio Camaso (1939–1977), Italian actor
- Don Camaso (born 1973), Filipino basketball player
