= Ishimori equation =

Partial differential equation

The Ishimori equation is a partial differential equation proposed by the Japanese mathematician Ishimori (1984). Its interest is as the first example of a nonlinear spin-one field model in the plane that is integrable (Sattinger, Tracy & Venakides 1991, p. 78).

== Equation ==
The Ishimori equation has the form

$$\frac{\partial \mathbf{S}}{\partial t} = \mathbf{S}\wedge \left(\frac{\partial^2 \mathbf{S}}{\partial x^2} + \frac{\partial^2 \mathbf{S}}{\partial y^2}\right)+ \frac{\partial u}{\partial x}\frac{\partial \mathbf{S}}{\partial y} + \frac{\partial u}{\partial y}\frac{\partial \mathbf{S}}{\partial x},$$	1a

$$\frac{\partial^2 u}{\partial x^2}-\alpha^2 \frac{\partial^2 u}{\partial y^2}=-2\alpha^2 \mathbf{S} \cdot \left(\frac{\partial \mathbf{S}}{\partial x}\wedge \frac{\partial \mathbf{S}}{\partial y}\right).$$	1b

== Lax representation ==
The Lax representation

$$L_t = AL - LA$$	2

of the equation is given by

$$L =\Sigma \partial_x + \alpha I\partial_y,$$	3a

$$A = -2i\Sigma\partial_x^2+(-i\Sigma_x-i\alpha\Sigma_y\Sigma+u_yI-\alpha^3u_x\Sigma)\partial_x.$$	3b

Here

$$\Sigma=\sum_{j=1}^3S_j\sigma_j,$$	4

the $\sigma_i$ are the Pauli matrices and $I$ is the identity matrix.

== Reductions ==
The Ishimori equation admits an important reduction: in 1+1 dimensions it reduces to the continuous classical Heisenberg ferromagnet equation (CCHFE). The CCHFE is integrable.

== Equivalent counterpart ==
The equivalent counterpart of the Ishimori equation is the Davey-Stewartson equation.

== See also ==
- Nonlinear Schrödinger equation
- Heisenberg model (classical)
- Spin wave
- Landau–Lifshitz model
- Soliton
- Vortex
- Nonlinear systems
- Davey–Stewartson equation
