= Michela Procesi =

Italian mathematician

Michela Procesi (born 1973) is an Italian mathematician specializing in Hamiltonian partial differential equations such as the nonlinear Schrödinger equation or wave equation. The Degasperis–Procesi equation is named for her. She is a professor of mathematics at Roma Tre University.

== Education and career ==
Procesi was born in 1973 in Rome, the daughter of mathematician Claudio Procesi. She earned a laurea in physics at the Sapienza University of Rome in 1998, and continued at la Sapienza for a PhD in mathematics in 2002. Her dissertation, Estimates on Hamiltonian splittings: tree techniques in the theory of homoclinic splitting and Arnold diffusion for a-priori stable systems, was supervised by Luigi Chierchia.

She became a postdoctoral researcher at the International School for Advanced Studies in Trieste and, with the support of the Istituto Nazionale di Alta Matematica Francesco Severi, at Roma Tre University. After continued work as a researcher at the University of Naples Federico II and la Sapienza, she obtained a position as an associate professor at Roma Tre University in 2015. She has been a full professor there since 2019.

== Recognition ==
Procesi was an invited speaker at the 2022 (virtual) International Congress of Mathematicians.
