= Witold Rybczyński =

Polish physicist and mathematician

Witold E(rasmus) Rybczynski (2 June 1881 in Stanisławów – 13 August 1949 in Lusławice) was a Polish physicist and mathematician, a professor at Lviv Polytechnic. In his mid-life, Rybczynski moved to Tarnów and had a second career as a high-school teacher and, later, writer.

Rybczynski's grandson is Witold Rybczynski, the Canadian architect and writer.
