= Gebauer =

Gebauer is a German surname. Notable people with the surname include:

- Christian Gebauer (born 1993), Austrian footballer
- Christian David Gebauer (1777–1831), Danish painter
- Edwin Gebauer (born 1884, date of death unknown), German politician
- Ernst Gebauer (1782–1865), German painter
- Étienne-François Gebauer (1776–1823), French composer and flautist
- Ferenc Gebauer (1888–1958), Austrian-born Hungarian firearms designer and pilot
- François-René Gebauer (1773–1845), French composer and bassoonist, brother of Michel-Joseph Gebauer
- Franz Xaver Gebauer (c. 1784–1822), German organist, composer, choirmaster, and music director
- Gabriele Gebauer (born 1958), Austrian handball player
- Ingrid Gebauer (born 1959), German footballer
- Jan Gebauer (1838–1907), Czech academic
- Johan Christian Gebauer (1808–1884), Danish composer and organist
- Josef Gebauer (1942–2004), Czech historian
- Judy GeBauer, American playwright
- Katharina Gebauer (born 1987), German politician
- Michel-Joseph Gebauer (1763–1812), French composer, brother of François René Gebauer
- Olly Gebauer (1908–1937), Austrian film actress
- Paul Gebauer (fl. early 1900s), German Olympic water polo player
- Steve Gebauer (born 1981), American curler
- Thomas Gebauer (born 1983), German footballer
- Ulrich Gebauer (born 1956), German actor
- Wendy Gebauer (born 1966), American soccer player
- Yvonne Gebauer (born 1966), German politician

== See also ==
- Neugebauer
- Richards-Gebaur Memorial Airport
