= Niebuhr =

Niebuhr is a German surname. Notable people with the surname include:

- Barthold Georg Niebuhr, (1776–1831), German statesman and historian
- Carsten Niebuhr, (1733–1815), German traveller, explorer and surveyor, and father of Barthold Georg Niebuhr (sometimes mistakenly called by his son's first name)
- H. Richard Niebuhr (1894–1962), Christian ethicist
- Reinhold Niebuhr (1892–1971), Christian theologian (brother of H. Richard Niebuhr)

== See also ==
- Neubauer
- Neugebauer
