= Margarete Schweikert =

German composer

Margarete Schweikert (16 February 1887 – 13 March 1957) was a German composer, music critic, violinist, and pianist who composed chamber music, approximately 160 songs, and a children's operetta, The Frog King.

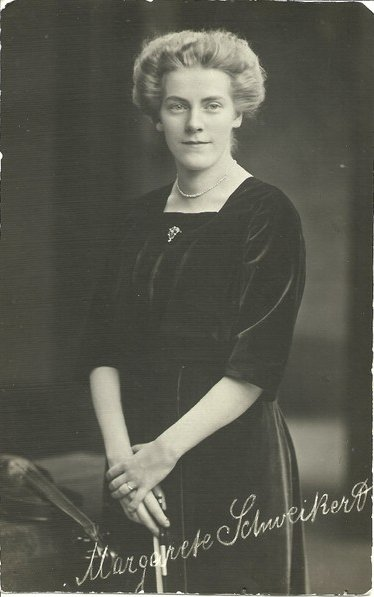
The German composer, Margarete Schweikert

== Biography ==
Schweikert was born in Karlsruhe, the only child of Friedrich and Luise Petry Schweikert. Her father sold insurance and was also a music critic for Neue Stuttgarter Musikzeitung and Karlsruher Blätter. He gave Schweikert her first violin lessons. Her mother played piano and helped her family manage the Jakob Petry Jewelry Store.

Schweikert attended the Munz Conservatory and the Baden Conservatory (today the Baden University of Music). She studied with Heinrich Deecke, S. de Lange, Joseph Haas, Max Herold, Theodor Munz, and Karl Wendling. Her first collection of songs, the Six Songs for a Singing Voice and Piano, was published in 1912. Her children's operetta The Frog King, based on a text by Erika Ebert, premiered in 1913. During this time, she also gave violin recitals throughout southern Germany, sometimes including her own compositions on the programs.

Schweikert married Hermann Voigt in 1923, and they had one daughter, Christiane, in 1924. A rule imposed in 1933, which restricted double work in families, affected Schweikert's ability to work on her music. She changed her name to Voigt-Schweikert, but continued to publish her music and writing under the name "Margarete Schweikert."

== Works ==
Schweikert wrote music criticism for the Deutsche Allgemeine Zeitung, Karlsruher Tagblatt, Münchner Zeitung, and Neue Musikzeitung. Her music was published by Fritz Müller and Wunderhorn Verlag Munich.

Shweikert composed over 160 songs, based on texts by Ferdinand Avenarius, A. von Berchthold, Hans Beversdorff, Otto Julius Bierbaum, Victor August Eberhard Bluthgen, Adolf Bube, Georg Busse-Palma, Georg Friedrich Daumer, Max Dauthendey, Richard Fedor Leopold Dehmel, Hans Heinrich Ehrler, Paul Alfred Enderling, Erich Enke, Gustav Falke, Friedrich Ludwig Konrad Fiedler, Casar Flaischlen, Johann von Goethe, Ernst Goll, Martin Greif, Eduard Rudolf Grisebach, Otto Erich Hartleben, Heinrich Heine, Albert Herzog, Hermann Hesse, Max Hoffman, Friedrich Holderlin, Adolf Holst, Maria Tolk Janitschek, Ludwig Jungmann, Martha Kropp, Isolde Kurz, Else Lasker-Schuler, Ludwig Marohl, Georg Marrell, Carl Meissner, Otto Michaeli, Agnes Miegel, Christian Morgenstern, Julius Mosen, Borries Baron von Munchhausen, Erminia von Natangen, Friedrich Heinrich Oser, Karl Pannier, Psalm 23, Psalm 104, Ferdinand Raimund, Robert Reinick, Anna Ritter, Fritz Romhildt, Carl Sacher, Margarete Sachse, Frieda Schanz, Ziska Luise Schember, Max Gottfried von Schenkendorf, Ernst Scherenberg, Wilhelm Schiffer, Johannes Schlaf, Gustav Schuler, Johannes Schweitzer, A. W. Stern, Maurice Reinhold von Stern, Karl Stieler, Marie Stona, Eva-Marie Stosch, Adolf Strodtmann, Julius Karl Reinhold Sturm, Auguste Supper, Carmen Sylva, Theowill Ubelacker, Ludwig Karl Vanselow, Heinrich Wilhelm Vierordt, Walther von der Vogelweide, Richard von Volkmann, Artur von Wallpach, O. Wentorf, Wilhelmine Grafin Wickenburg-Almasy, and Ernst Zahn.

In 1950 Schweikert became an expert advisor for music at the Karlsruhe Gemeinschaft Deutscher und Oesterreichischer Künstlerinnenvereine (GEDOK; Association of German and Austrian Female Artists). From 1955 until her death in 1957 she served as the director of GEDOK.

Schweikert's papers are archived in the Badische Landesbibliothek Karlsruhe. They include piano and organ pieces, 160 songs, and chamber music, as well as her handwritten memoir.

== Discography ==
- Antes Edition BM14.9001 German Piano Music
- Antes Edition BM31.9207 Chamber Music
- TYXart TXA16085 Margaret Schweikert Vocal Music
- TYXart TXA16086 Margaret Schweikert Vocal Music
- Bernhard Berchtold (tenor), Jeannette La Deur (piano) Schweikert: Im bitteren Menschenland (2018) (TYXart TXA16086) CD
- Kitty Whately (mezzo-soprano), Joseph Middleton (piano) Befreit: A Soul Surrendered (2023) (Chandos CHAN20177) CD
