= Neugebauer =

Neugebauer is a German surname. Notable people with the surname include:

== Academics ==
- Gerry Neugebauer (1932–2014), American astronomer
- Hans E. J. Neugebauer (1905–1987), German-American imaging scientist
- Marcia Neugebauer (born 1932), American geophysicist
- Otto E. Neugebauer (1899–1990), Austrian-American mathematician and historian of science
- Rainer O. Neugebauer (born 1954), German educationalist, historian and social scientist
- Reimund Neugebauer (born 1953), German mechanical engineer and professor

== Artists ==
- Ursula Neugebauer (born 1960), German artist
- Walter Neugebauer (1921–1992), Croatian comic book artist

== Performers ==
- Alfred Neugebauer (1888–1957), Austrian film actor
- Hans Neugebauer (1916–1994), German opera director, set designer and opera singer
- Hartmut Neugebauer (1942–2017), German actor, voice actor and dialogue director
- Veronika Neugebauer (1968–2009), German actress and voice actress

== Politicians ==
- Fritz Neugebauer (born 1944), Second President of the National Council of Austria
- Laura Neugebauer (born 1995), German politician
- Mieczysław Norwid-Neugebauer (1884–1954), minister in the interwar Polish government
- Randy Neugebauer (born 1949), American congressman

== Sportspeople ==
- Jari Neugebauer (born 1994), German ice hockey player
- Karin Neugebauer (born 1955), German freestyle swimmer
- Leo Neugebauer (born 2000), German decathlete
- Nick Neugebauer (born 1980), American baseball player
- Tomasz Neugebauer (born 2003), Polish footballer

== Others ==
- Annie Neugebauer, American author
- Lila Neugebauer (born 1985), American theatre director
- Rudolf Neugebauer (1912–1945), German SS officer during the Nazi era
- Toby Neugebauer (born 1971), American businessman

Other uses

- Neugebauer SA, a Brazilian chocolate manufacturing company

== See also ==
- Neugebauer equations, a simplified model for the color of halftones
- Neubauer
- Gebauer
