= Helen Zelezny-Scholz =

Czech born sculptor and architectural sculptor

Helene Zelezny-Scholz
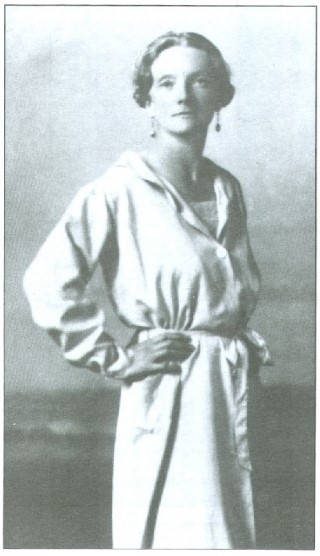
- Born: Helena Scholzová; 16 August 1882; Chropyně, Moravia, Austria-Hungary - now - Czech Republic
- Died: 18 February 1974 (aged 91); Rome, Italy
- Education: Vienna, Dresden, Berlin, Brussels and Florence
- Known for: Sculpture, Drawing, Ceramics
- Notable work: see below

Helen Zelezny, also known in Europe as Helene Zelezny-Scholz, Helen Scholz, Helene Scholz-Zelezny or Helene Scholzová-Železná (16 August 1882 – 18 February 1974), was a Czech born sculptor and architectural sculptor. She was an influential figure in the sculpture of north Moravia and Silesia in the late nineteenth and early twentieth centuries. Zelezny created sculpted portraits, including portraits of members of the Habsburg family, Count Franz Conrad von Hötzendorf, Lady Sybil Grahamová, Benito Mussolini, and Tomáš Garrigue Masaryk with whom she had a close relationship from 1932 to 1934. Zelezny is also known as an Italian sculptor as she lived and worked for many years in Rome.

== Life ==
Zelezny was born in Chropyně, in the Austro-Hungarian Empire, and raised in the village of Třebovice, which is now part of the city of Ostrava in Austrian Silesia. Her mother was the German writer and poet the countess, Maria Stona and her grandfather was the industrial manager and entrepreneur de:Alois Scholz. Zelezny spent her childhood at the family château owned by her mother. Stona frequently received intellectual and creative personalities from all over Europe. Zelezny became multilingual, speaking English, Italian, French, and German.

Zelezny studied drawing in Vienna and Dresden. She studied sculpture in Berlin under Fritz Heinemann, and in Brussels for four years where her teacher was Charles van der Stappen. In 1912, in Ostrava, Zelezny curated an exhibition of van der Stappen's works. After a year of study in Paris, Zelezny moved to Florence, Italy. From 1909 to 1913, Zelezny studied with the Swiss artist Augusto Giacometti and travelled with him to Switzerland. Zelezny was also in regular contact with artists such as Hans Kestranek, Edward Gordon Craig and Julius Rolshoven.

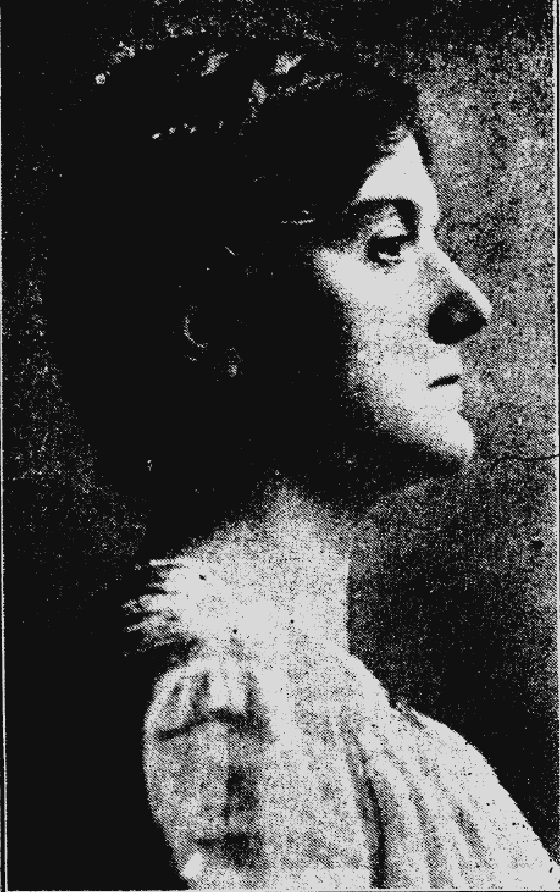
Zelezny in 1913

In 1913, Zelezny travelled to Tunis with Georg Brandes. While there she visited Harems and become acquainted with their residents and customs. She portrayed them in her sculptural work. In 1914, at the outbreak of World War I, Zelezny moved to Vienna. She was engaged to sculpt portraits of members of the Habsburg imperial family, including Princess Zita of Bourbon-Parma. In this period, Zelezny married. After the war, in 1919, Zelezny returned to Italy; to Florence and later to Rome. There she taught sculpture to children.

From 1922, right up until her death in 1974, Zelezny kept a studio at 54 Via Margutta where she held regular art classes. She usually spent her summers in Czechoslovakia. The studio at 54 Via Margutta was built by the Marquis Francesco Patrizi in 1855. He constructed a palace with apartments where artists could live and work. Pablo Picasso, Igor Stravinsky, and Giacomo Puccini produced some of their greatest works in these studios in the early 1900s. In 1934, Zelezny exhibited her work at Jean Charpentier's gallery featuring the sculptural group Work days and Holidays. After the Second World War, Zelezny wanted to donate her family's château in Třebovice to the Czechoslovak government as a centre for young artists. This did not eventuate and by the late 1950s, the building was in ruins.

From 1946 to 1949, Zelezny lived in the United States where she taught mixed media at institutions in and around Philadelphia such as the Philadelphia Museum of Art and Swarthmore College.

Zelezny died in Rome 1974 and is buried at the Protestant Cemetery.

== Works ==
Slovak Family, bronze, 1933

Zelezny's works include more than 300 sculptural portraits such as busts, reliefs and statuettes in marble, bronze and terracotta.

Her works were exhibited in Berlin and Vienna in 1907, in Rome in 1925 and at the Doria Pamphilj Gallery in 1932 and also in Paris.

Several of Zelezny's works were destroyed during the Second World War. One was the great central altar representing the life of Hedwig of Silesia in the Church dedicated to that saint in Opava, Czech Silesia.

In 1973, Zelezny wrote a book, My Dear Pupils, which showcases the work of some of her students. Zelezny was commissioned at one point to sculpt a monument to those who died in the First World War.

Zelezny's works are curated in the permanent collection of the castle Hradec nad Moravicí, the Silesian Museum (Opava), the Gallery of the Fine Arts at the Museum of Fine Arts in Ostrava, and in the National Gallery in Prague. Her reliefs hang in the Church of St. Hedwig in Opava.

== Selected works ==
- The Thoughtful (1906), bronze, the castle Raduň
- The Melancholia (1906), bronze, the castle Raduň
- Allegory of the Drama and Music (1907), town theatre in Moravská Ostrava (destroyed)
- Allegory of the Sorrow (1909), Alois Schozes' tomb, Gratz
- Charles van der Stappen (1909), small statuette
- Georg Brandes (1913), two small statuettes and a bust, Tunis
- Allegory Justice (1914), the judicial building, Fryštát
- Extra Ausgabe (1915), bronze figural group
- The Slovak Family (1923), bronze, castle, Raduň
- Dr. Ostrčil (1924), tombe sculpture, Praha-Olšany
- Portrait of Zdena Mastna (1927), sculpture
- Cenotaph (1930), Těšín (destroyed)
- The Common and Feast Days (1933), bronze, gallery, Ostrava
- Tomáš Garrigue Masaryk (1933), bronze, Museum Silesie, Opava
- The life the saintliness (1936), cycle of ten reliefs, St. Hedvika, Opava
- Pope Paul VI (1967)

== Books ==
- Scanno, Tunisi, Slovacchia. (1932)
- Elena Zelezny-Scholz, Scultrice. (1957)
- Sculptured Prayer (1968)
- Zelezny: portrait sculpture, 1917 to 1970. (1970)
- Aus der Jugend einer Bildhauerin, Tagenbuchblätter aus den Jahren 1908–1917. (1972) (Diary of a young sculptor, pages from the years 1908 to 1917.)
- My Dear Pupils (1973)
- Nachlese. (1974) (Gleanings.)

== See also ==
- The diary of Georg Brandes (1842 - 1927).
- Biografický Slovník Slezska a severní Moravy. (1998) (Biographical dictionary of Silesia and Northern Moravia.)
- One of ten reliefs of the life of Saint Hedvika, in Saint Hedvika's church, Opava. (1936), photograph by J. Novák.
- Chrám sv. Hedviky v Opavě. (Cathedral of Saint Hedwig, Opava.) Josef Gebauer.
- Papers of the Vlastivědné regional museum of Olomouc.
- TGM: Proč se neřekne pravda? (1996) (Why not tell the truth.)
- Helena Železná-Scholzová, zapomenutá sochařka. (1999) (Helena Zelezna-Scholzova, forgotten sculptress. A thesis at the University of Olomouc in Czech.)
- Anthony Mann: Zelezny – Portrait Sculpture 1917–1970. Rome 1970
- Martin Pelc: Tomáš Garrigue Masaryk a Helena Železná-Scholzová. Český časopis historický, 2016, Vol. 114, No. 1, p. 116-145
