= Monument to the Dynasty =

Monument in Brussels, Belgium

- Monument à la Dynastie (French); Monument voor de Dynastie (Dutch)
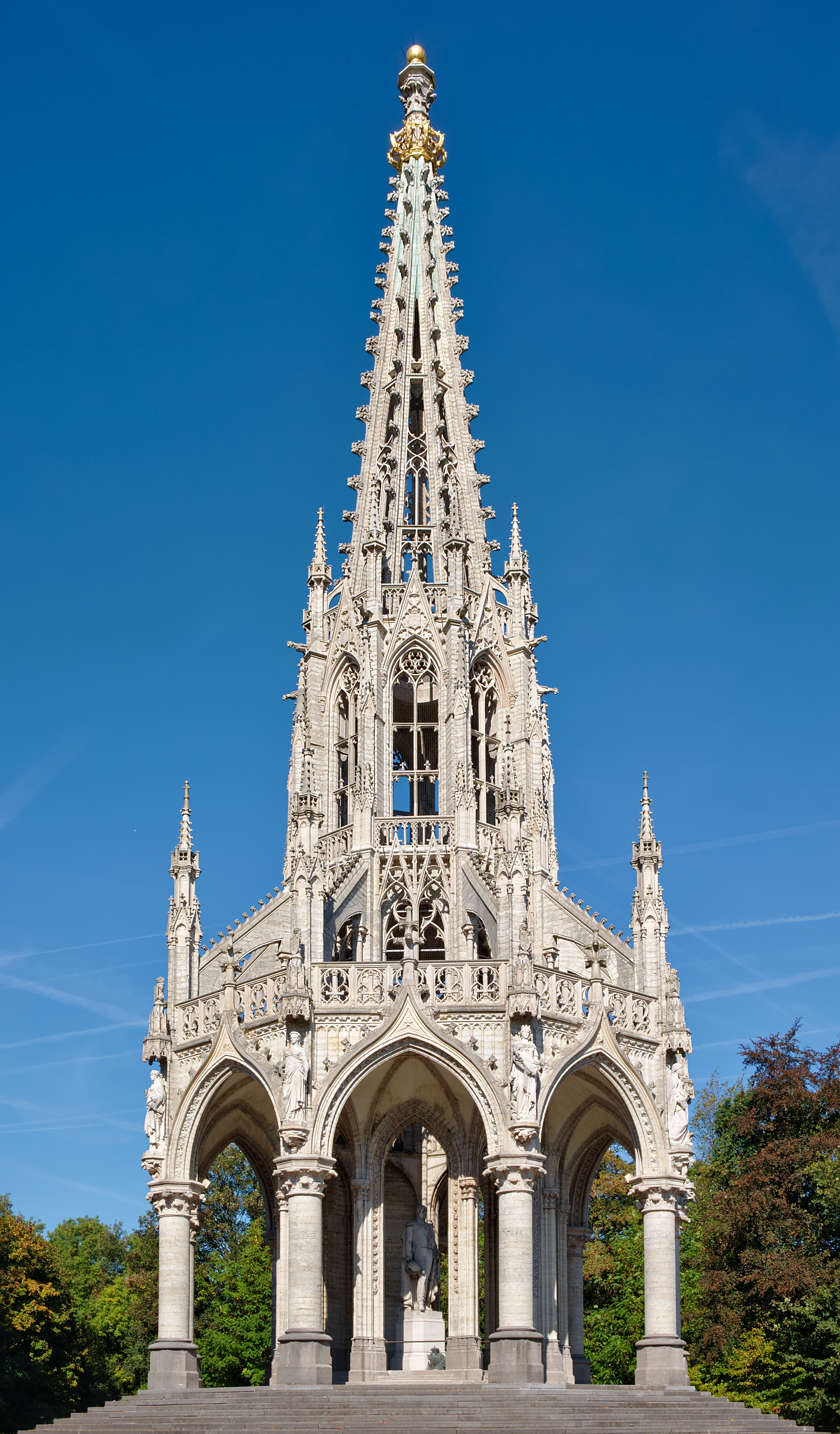
- Interactive map of Monument to the Dynasty
- Location: Place de la Dynastie / Vorstenhuisplein; 1000 City of Brussels, Brussels-Capital Region, Belgium
- Coordinates: 50°53′26″N 4°21′12″E
- Designer: Louis De Curte
- Beginning date: 1878
- Completion date: 1881
- Dedicated to: King Leopold I

The Monument to the Dynasty (French: Monument à la Dynastie; Dutch: Monument voor de Dynastie) is a monument erected in Brussels, Belgium, in memory of King Leopold I, first King of the Belgians. The monument is located in Laeken Park, on the Place de la Dynastie/Vorstenhuisplein, on top of a 50-metre-high (160 ft) hill. It completes the monumental axis, which starts from the portal of the Royal Palace of Laeken, and which leads to the monument after crossing the Avenue du Parc Royal/Koninklijk Parklaan via the Avenue de la Dynastie/Vorstenhuislaan.

== History ==
The monument was designed by the Ghent architect Louis De Curte in a neo-Gothic style. It was built from 1878 to 1881 on the orders of King Leopold II, who had the monument erected in honour of the founding of the dynasty by his father, King Leopold I, whom he had succeeded as King of the Belgians in 1865. For the memorial, De Curte drew inspiration from the Scott Monument in Edinburgh and, more vaguely, from the Albert Memorial in London. The monument was inaugurated in July 1880, during the opening of Laeken Park, to mark the fiftieth anniversary of Belgian independence.

The monument was renovated in 2001 on the occasion of the Belgian presidency of the European Union. It remains closed to the public for fear of vandalism. In June 2026, new LED scenographic lighting was installed.

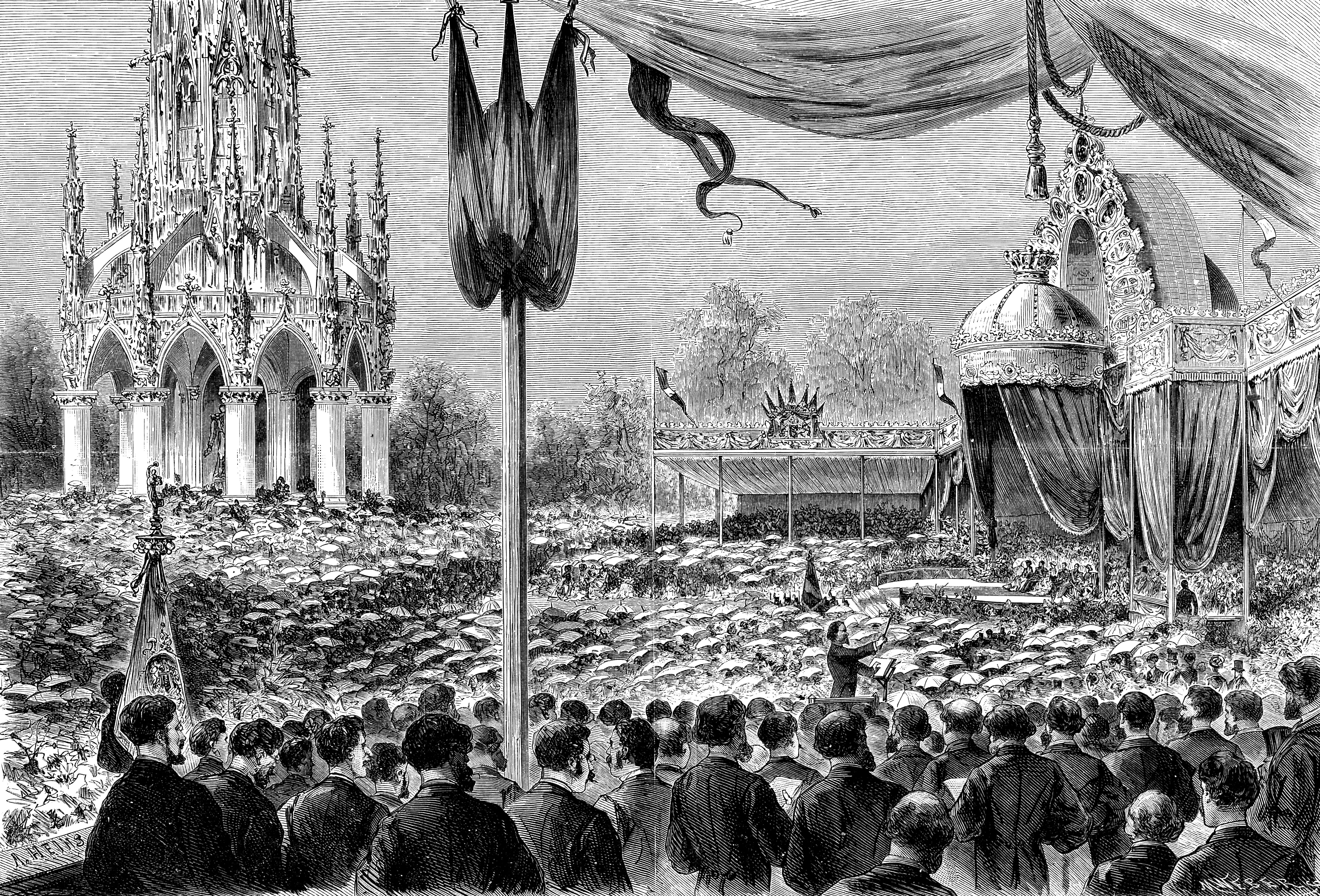
Inauguration of the Monument to the Dynasty in Laeken Park, 21 July 1880, etching by Armand Heins from L'Illustration nationale

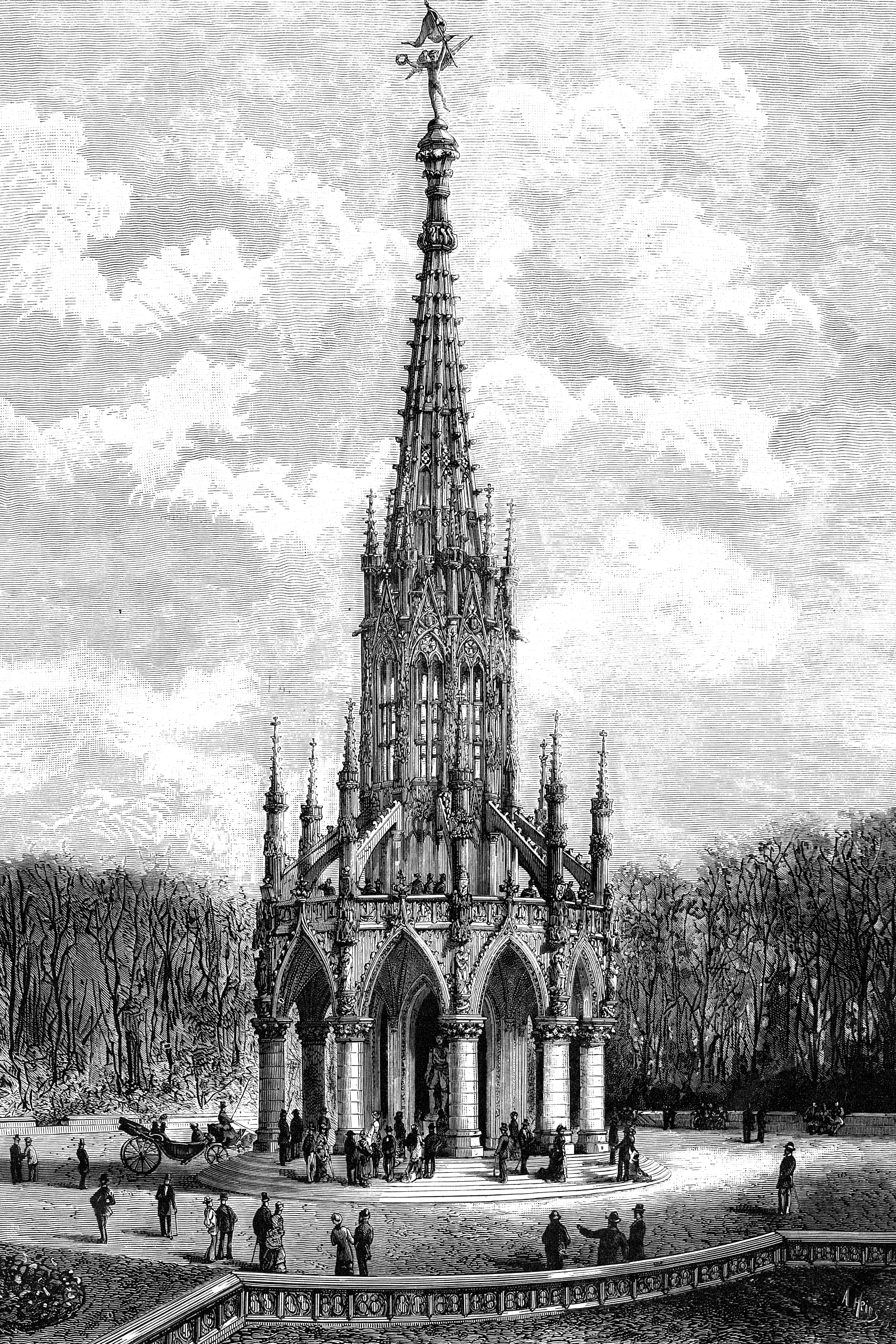
The Monument to the Dynasty in 1880, etching by Armand Heins from L'Illustration nationale

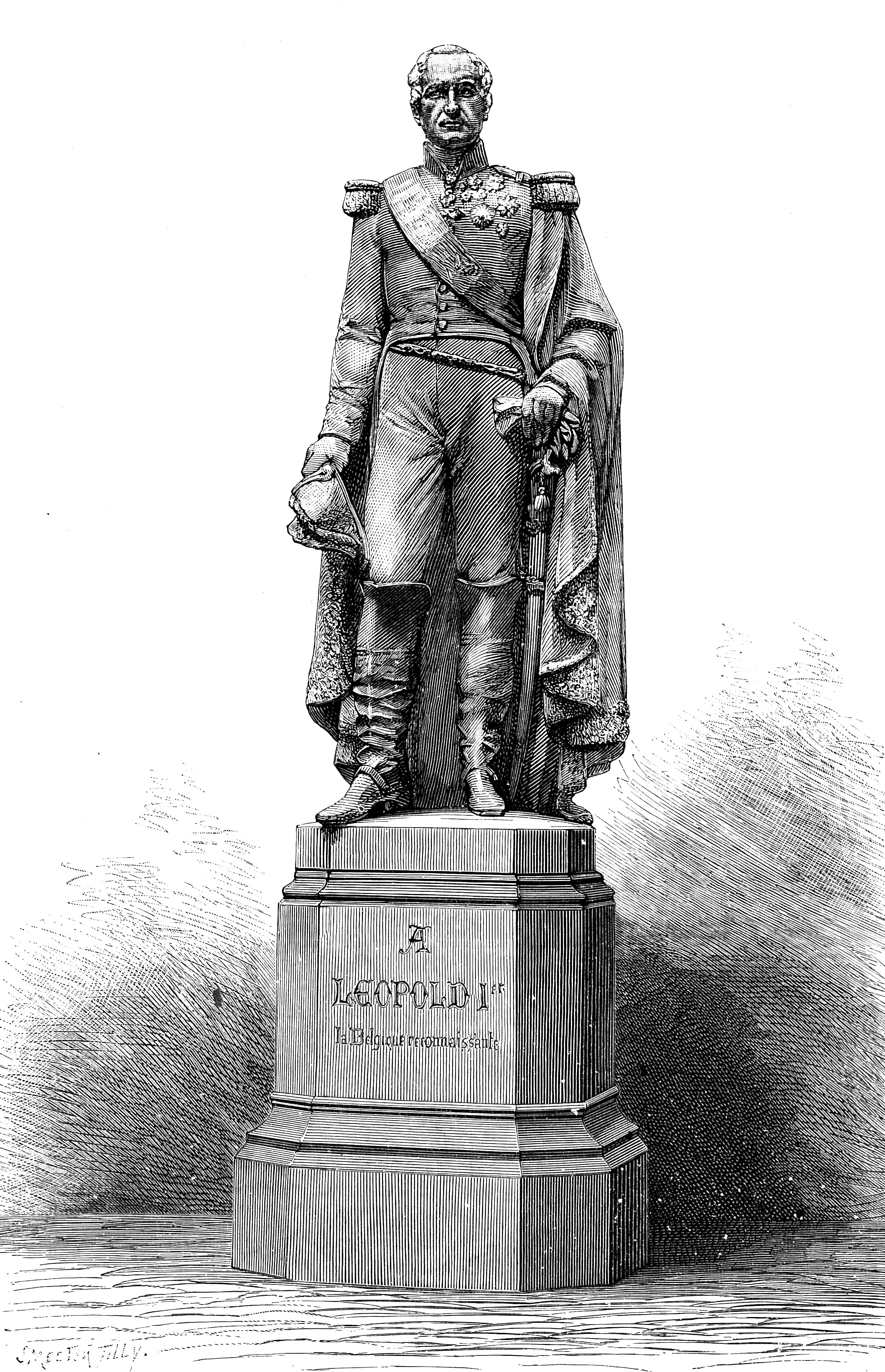
Statue of King Leopold I in 1880, etching by Joseph Smeeton and Auguste Tilly from L'Illustration nationale

== Iconography ==
=== Leopold I ===
At the centre of a nine-bay gallery, each symbolising one of the nine original Belgian Provinces, is a sculpture of King Leopold I by Guillaume Geefs, who also created the statue of Leopold I on the Congress Column. On this substructure rests an almost 50-metre-high (160 ft) spire, topped with a golden crown. Above the statues of the nine Belgian Provinces, a Leo Belgicus holds the coat of arms of the province in question. At the rear of the monument, on the north side, a staircase gives access to a walk above the peristyle. This walk passes under flying buttresses adorned with small gargoyles.

=== Nine provinces ===
The statue of the king is protected by a canopy in the shape of a perfect enneagon resting on a stepped plinth. This unusual shape made it possible to represent the nine provinces that made up Belgium at the time. The allegories representing them were entrusted to a collection of artists who were inspired by the drawings of Georges Houtstont: the Province of Namur is symbolised by Metallurgy (Thomas Vinçotte), the Province of Luxembourg by Hunting (Albert Desenfans), the Province of Liège by Armoury (Adolphe Fassin), the Province of Limburg by Agriculture (Antoine van Rasbourg), the Province of Antwerp by Trade and Navigation (Frans Deckers), the Province of Brabant by the Royal sceptre (Charles van der Stappen), the Province of East Flanders by Spinning mills and Horticulture (Gérard van der Linden), the Province of West Flanders by Fishing (Henri Pickery), and the Province of Hainaut by Coal (Charles Brunin).

=== Spire ===
The spire is 50 metres (160 ft) high, which refers to the age of the kingdom in 1880, and bears a crown, referring to the kingdom and the king. It was originally topped by a standing statue in chased copper and bronze, The Genius of Grateful Belgium waving the national flag, by the sculptor Guillaume De Groot. In November 1880, however, unbalanced by the pressure of the wind, it was removed and stored. In June 1882, the Minister of Public Works proposed replacing the flag originally held by the genius with a torch and mounting the work on the roof of the Royal Museums of Fine Arts in the Royal Quarter of Brussels. The sculpture was thus renamed The Genius of the Arts.

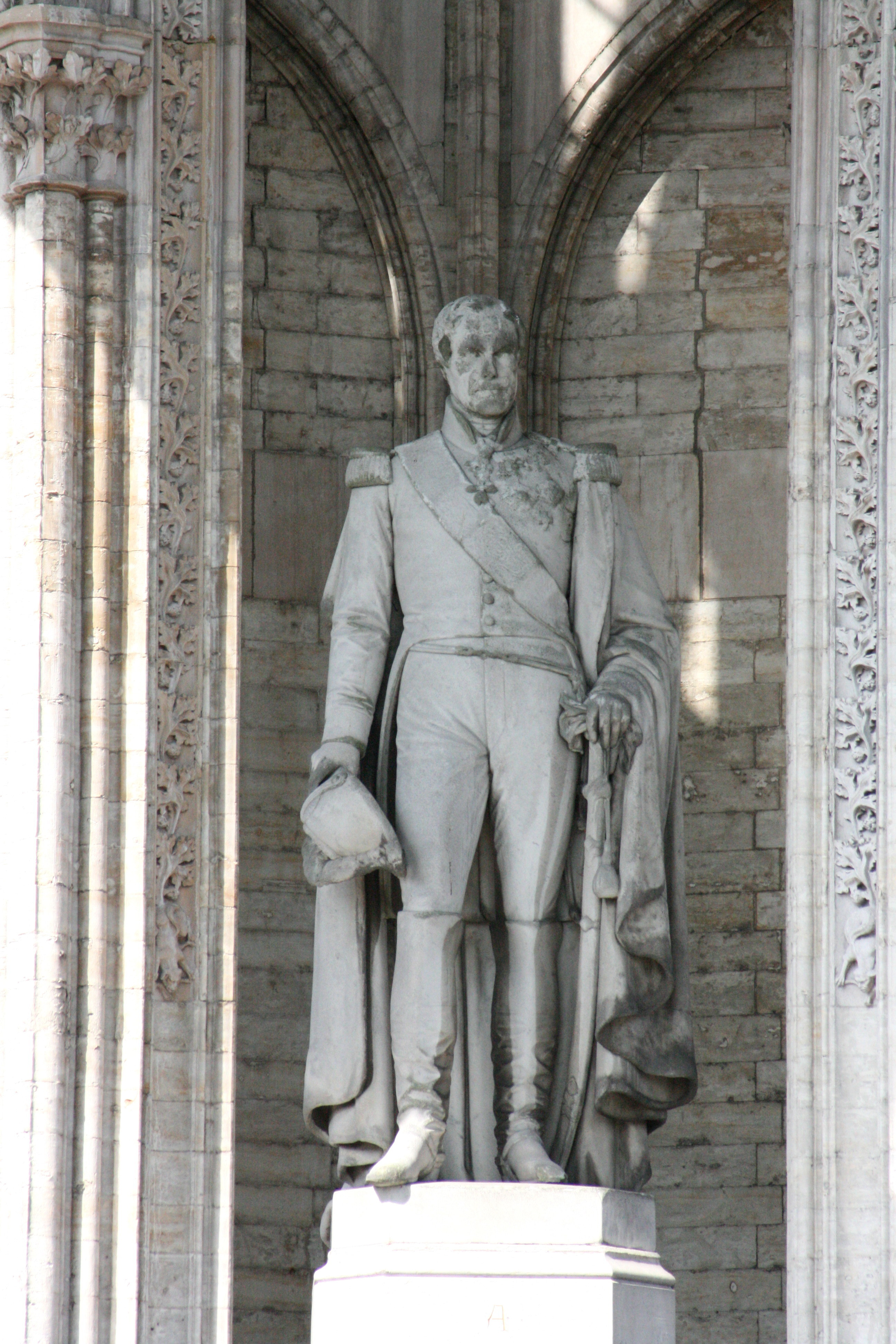
Statue of King Leopold I by Guillaume Geefs

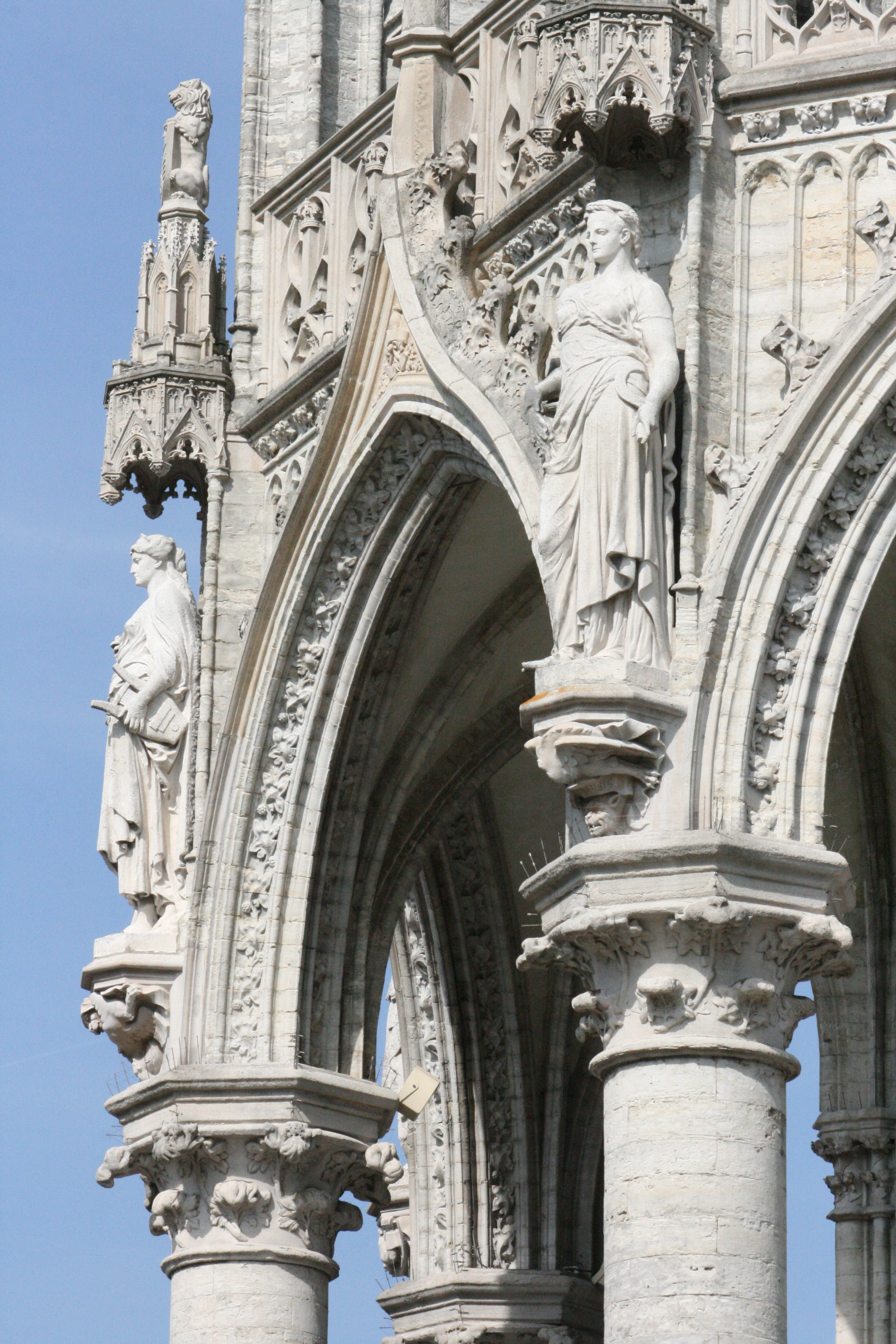
Province of Liège (left) and Province of Limburg (right) by Adolphe Fassin and Antoine van Rasbourg

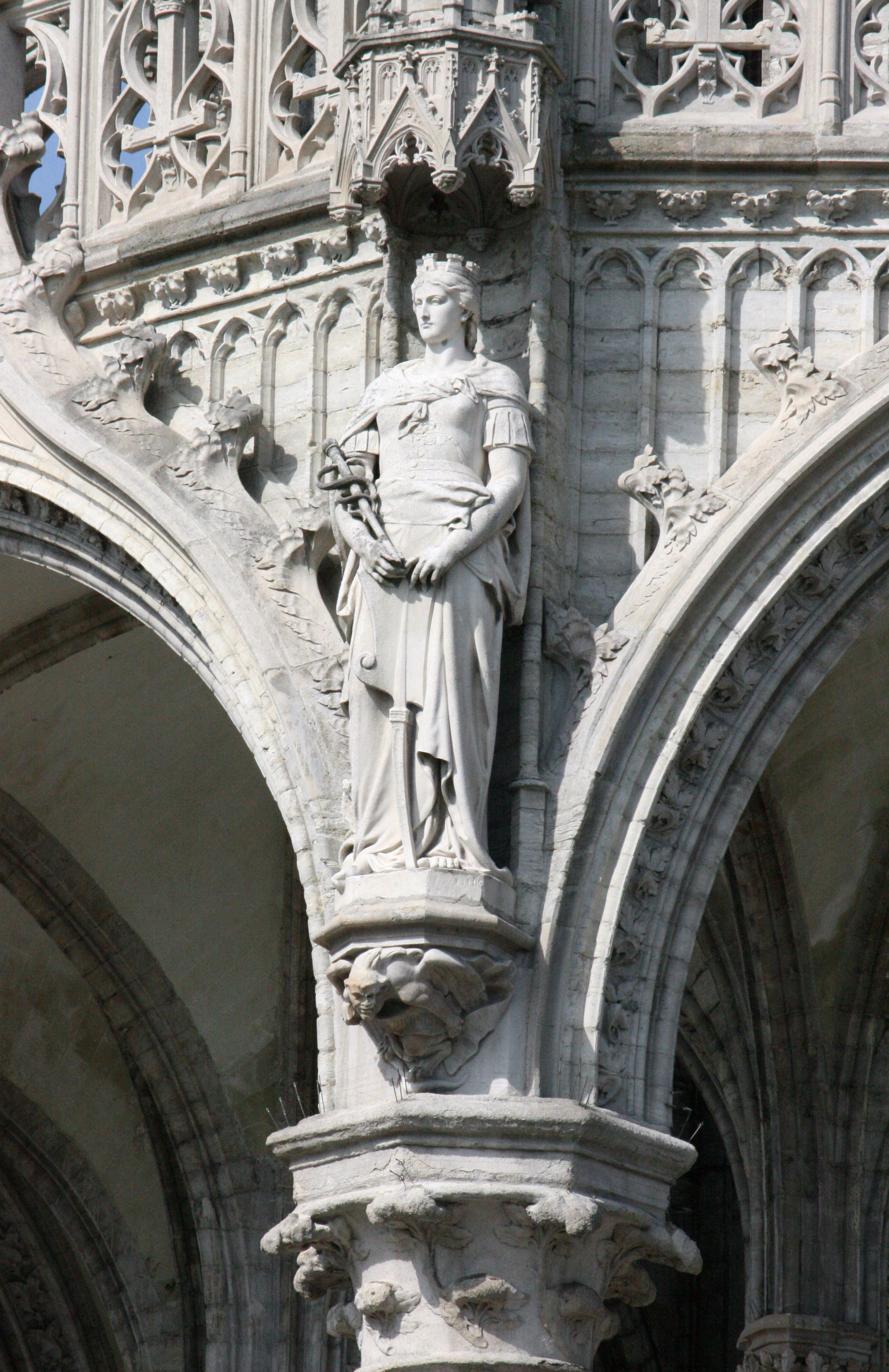
Province of Brabant by Charles van der Stappen

== See also ==
- Sculpture in Brussels
- History of Brussels
- Culture of Belgium
- Belgium in the long nineteenth century
