= Neubauer =

Neubauer or Neubaur is a surname of German origin, meaning "new farmer". The Neubauer surname appears in several historical German records over the centuries. Notable individuals include Johann Neubauer (1667-1720), a Lutheran theologian from Jena, and Georg Neubauer (1763-1841), a Bavarian architect who designed several churches and civic buildings.

Additional notable people with the surname include:

- Adolf Neubauer (1831–1907), Rabbinical scholar
- Alfred Neubauer (1891–1980), Mercedes Grand Prix racing manager
- Christine Neubauer (born 1962), German actress
- Chuck Neubauer (born 1950), American journalist
- Dagmar Neubauer (born 1962), German athlete
- Earl Neubauer (1885–1975), American politician from Nebraska
- Greta Neubauer (born 1991), American politician from Wisconsin
- Harald Neubauer (1951–2021), German far-right politician and journalist
- Jeff Neubauer (born 1971), American basketball coach
- Jeffrey A. Neubauer (born 1955), American politician from Wisconsin
- Jonas Neubauer (born 1981–2021), American Tetris player
- Joseph Neubauer (born 1941), CEO of Aramark
- Kurt Neubauer (1899–1923), early Nazi, participant in the Beer Hall Putsch
- Lisa Neubauer (born 1957), American judge from Wisconsin
- Luisa Neubauer (born 1996), German climate activist
- Marlene Neubauer-Woerner (1918–2010), German sculptor
- Mona Neubaur (born 1977), German politician
- Otto Neubauer (1874–1957), German-English biochemist
- Paul Neubauer (born 1962), concerto soloist and instructor
- Peter B. Neubauer (1913–2008), child psychiatrist
- Richard A Neubauer (1924–2007), American physician
- Theodor Neubauer (1890–1945), German Communist politician and resistance fighter
- Trevor Neubauer or Trevor Donovan (born 1978 or 1982), American actor and model
- Thomas Neubauer (born 1999), French racing driver
- Zdeněk Neubauer (1942–2016), philosopher and biologist

== See also ==
- Neugebauer
- Bauer (disambiguation)
- Neubert
