= Maria Stona =

Writer and poet (1859–1944)

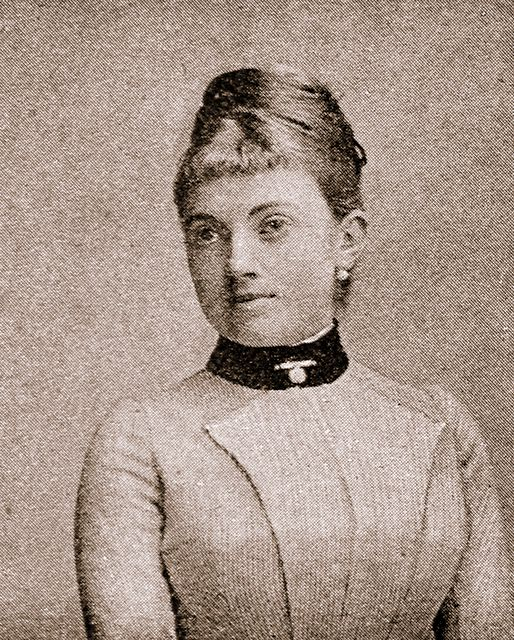
- Born: Marie Stonawski; 1 December 1859; Třebovice, Austrian Silesia
- Died: 30 March 1944 (aged 84); Třebovice, Nazi Germany
- Writing career
- Genre: Poetry

Maria Stona (born Marie Stonawski, married Marie Scholz; 1 December 1859 – 30 March 1944) was a German-Czech poet and writer. Her daughter was the sculptor Helen Zelezny-Scholz.

In Třebovice she led artistic salon. She drew into her circles many noticeable persons, world-famous artists, politicians and writers such as Georg Brandes, Georges Clemenceau, Berta von Suttner, Flinders Petrie, Stefan Zweig, being among her guests in her home the Třebovice (Strzebowitz) Castle.

Maria Stona corresponded regularly with Georg Brandes from 1899 to his death 1927. She died in 1944, during the World War II. Some of her books are available at The Royal Library in Copenhagen, which also holds some of her letters in the "Georg Brandes Arkivet".

== Life ==
Maria Stona was born Marie Stonawski on 1 December 1859 in Třebovice, Austrian Silesia (now the Czech Republic). She was a daughter of Joseph Stonawski, who bought the Třebovice Castle (German: Strebowitz) in 1859, and his wife Marie Prymus from Soběšovice in Cieszyn Silesia. She used the first two syllables of her birth name, Stonawski, as her pseudonym Maria Stona.

In 1881, Maria married Dr. jur. Albert Scholz, a son of Alois Scholz (1821–1883), the director of the steel works of Vítkovice mining and metallurgical trade union in Moravia-Ostrava. The couple lived from 1881 to 1888 in Chropyně in Moravia, where their daughter Helen Zelezny-Scholz was born on 16 August 1882. The marriage to Albert Scholz lasted until 1899. Maria Stona most likely had a second marriage to the writer, editor and art critic Charles Erasmus Kleinert (1837–1933). In 1933, Maria Stona published a tribute to his life: An Old Austrian - Charles Erasmus Kleinert. His life and his works were published by Adolf Drechsler, Opava in Silesia.

== Literary circles at the Třebovice Castle ==
After the death of his father, Joseph took Maria Stonawski Scholz to Třebovice and in Silesia, where the Třebovice Castle and the surrounding park was their residence. At Třebovice Castle, Maria Stona was the center of a literary circle. Landowner and Countess Marie Stonawská-Scholzová loved art. She produced poetry, stories, novels, and travel sketches under the pseudonym Maria Stona. After a short marriage, she was able to live independently thanks to having financial security. She actively participated in the cultural life of the town – she visited exhibits and the theatre, but mainly she supported artists. In this way the château in Třebovice became a cultural centre where artists and the intelligentsia of various nations gathered. Stonawská-Scholzová bountifully hosted and supported local artists regardless of nationality, and eagerly introduced young artists to the public.

The list of important personalities who stayed at Třebovice includes writer Baroness Marie von Ebner-Eschenbach, noted Austrian prose writer Stefan Zweig, the Nobel Peace Prize winner Bertha von Suttner, writer Subhas Chandra Bose doctor and writer Karl Schönherr, the writer and journalist Paul Keller, the Danish literary critic Georg Brandes, and personalities of political life. She encouraged young artists who belonged to which the Czech pianist and composer Ilja Hurník and others traveled for Eastern Europe, Southern France and Spain.

Her extensive literary heritage, included travelogues, poetry, often sentimental, short stories, novellas and novels. Maria Stona was one of the most important women writers of her time. They drew their psychological empathy from the surrounding world, as Russian troops had occupied Moravia and Silesia in 1945 and Třebovice Castle was lost as a family residence.

Maria Stona who died in 1944, wrote in German. Her volumes of poetry were translated into Czech by the novelist Helen Salichová after her death.

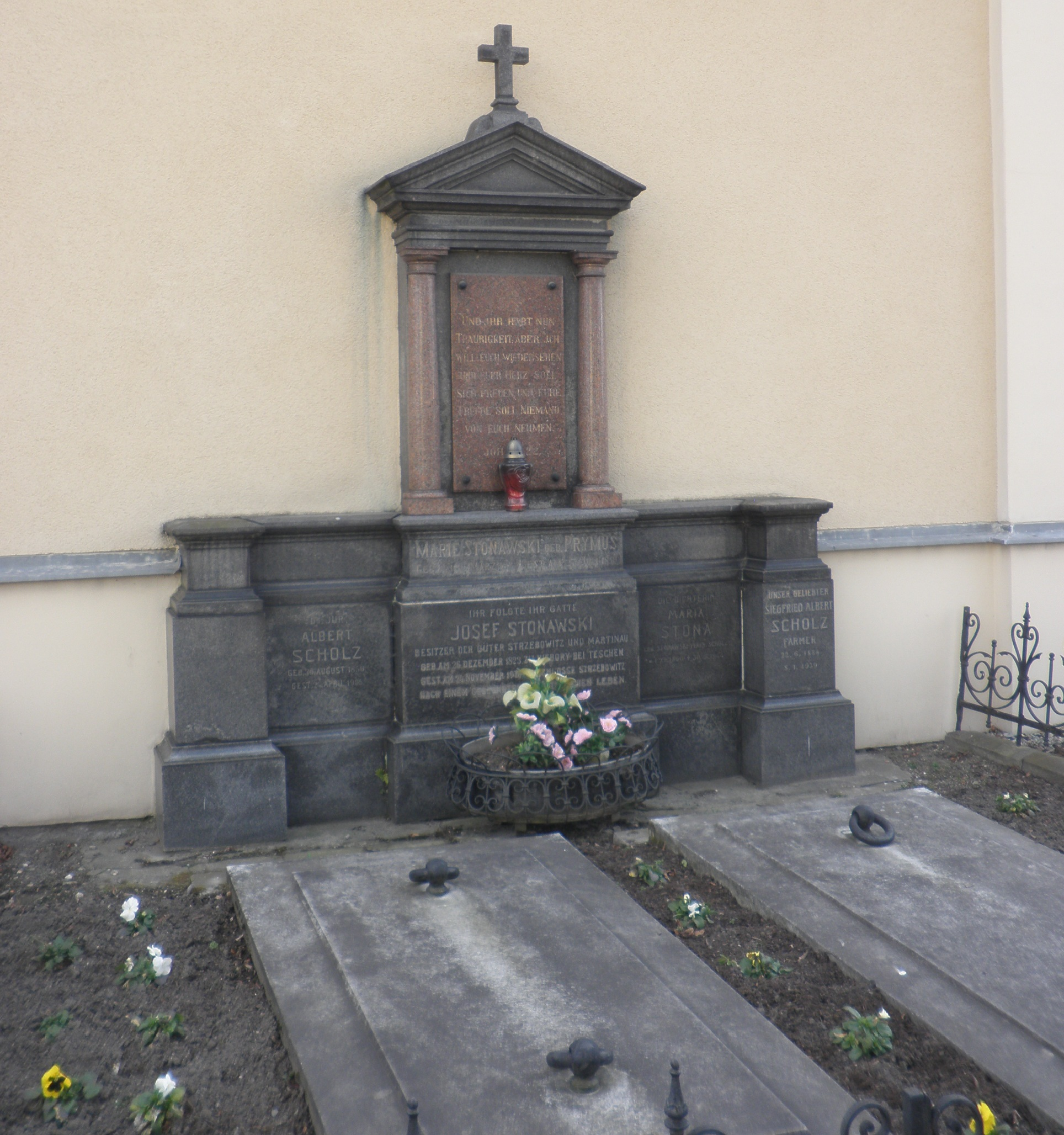
Maria Stona burial place in Ostrava-Třebovice

== Works ==
- Mein lachendes Buch
- Ein Alt - Österreicher. Karl Erasmus Kleinert. Sein Leben und seine Werke
- Neue Gedichte
- Das Buch der Liebe, 1888, 3rd expanded edition 1897, Anzengruber Verlag Wien, Berlin.
- Liebe einer jungen Frau, 3rd edition, Anzengruber Verlag Wien und Berlin.
- Klingende Tiefen, New Poems, Anzengruber Verlag Wien Berlin.
- Flammen und Fluten, Poems, Anzengruber Verlag Wien Berlin.
- König Eri, Ein Lied der Liebe, Anzengruber Verlag Wien Berlin.
- Menschen und Paragraphie. Stories, Anzengruber Verlag Wien Berlin
- Erzählt und gesungen, Stories and Poems, Anzengruber Verlag Wien Berlin.
- Ludwig Jakobowski im Licht des Lebens, Anzengruber Verlag Wien, Berlin.
- Der Rabenschrei, novel of divorce, 1907.
- Die Heidelerche und andere heitere Geschichten, Philipp Reclam Verlag 1910.
- Mein Dorf, short stories and sketches from Silesia, Kürschners Bücherschatz Nr. 604.
- Klein Doktor – Ein Kinderleben, Leipzig Turmverlag Albert Platzek 1918
- Das Doppelfest im Ort, in: Rur-Blumen, Jahrgang 1923, Nr. 12, Blätter für Heimatgeschichte. Beilage zum Jülischen Kreisblatt, Jahrgang 1921 bis 1924.
- Von Prag in die Provence über Strassburg, Verdun und Reims, Anzengruber Verlag Wien Berlin 1922.
- Das schöne Spanien, a journey in 51 images, AGV Verlag Berlin, ohne Jahr ( 1942 bis 1944)-
- Vor dem Sturz, social novel.
- Rachel, Roman, 2nd Reprint. Anzengruber Verlag Wien Berlin.
- O du spaßige Welt der Frauen, Steyrermühl Verlag Wien, Tagblatt Bibliothek Nr. 76.
- Die wilde Wolhynierin, Roman from Ukraine, a reference to the life story of the cousin Maria Stonas Wilhelmina Ladislawa Koszyce (Kosietz), daughter of Wenceslaus Koszyce in Zywiec (Saybusch) in Galicia, then a crown land of the Austria-Hungarian Empire, Anzengruber Verlag, Vienna and Leipzig, 1922.
- Eine Fahrt nach Karpathorußlans, Adolf Drechsler Verlag Troppau 1936.
- Erzähltes Erbe – selection of East German narrative, to page 27 to 52 Stona Maria: My mother (Marie Stonavski née Koszyce, died 1890) Odertor-publisher of literature from Eastern Sudetenland, Heidelberg 1961.
- Dorfgestalten aus dem Vorfeld von Groß-Ostrau, ausgewählt, introduced and edited by Fritz Eichler, Odertor-publisher of literature from the Eastern Sudetenland, Heidelberg in 1962 with a dedication of the 100th birthday of Maria Stona (born 1861) and a portrait photograph of her.

== Literature ==
- Biographical Dictionary published on the history of the Bohemian Lands, Volume III (N - Sch) on behalf of the Collegium Carolinum by de:Ferdinand Seibt, de:Hans Lemberg, de:Helmut Slapnicka, de:Oldenbourg Verlag, Munich 2000, p. 744th
- Austrian Bibiographisches Lexicon, 11 with references to Mary Stona.
- de:Josef Mühlberger: History of German Literature in Bohemia from 1900 to 1939, Volume 1
- John Nagl, de:Jakob Zeidler, de:Edward Castle: German-Austrian literary history - A handbook on the history of German literature in Austria-Hungary, Volume 3 and 4
- de:Franz Brümmer: Encyclopedia of German poets and prose writers from the early 19th century to the present, Reclam, 1913.
- Martin Pelc: Maria Stona und ihr Salon in Strzebowitz : Kultur am Rande der Monarchie, der Republik und des Kanons. Opava : Schlesische Universität in Opava, 2014. 295 pp. ISBN 978-80-7510-056-6
