= Laeken Park =

Park in Brussels, Belgium

- Parc de Laeken (French); Park van Laken (Dutch)
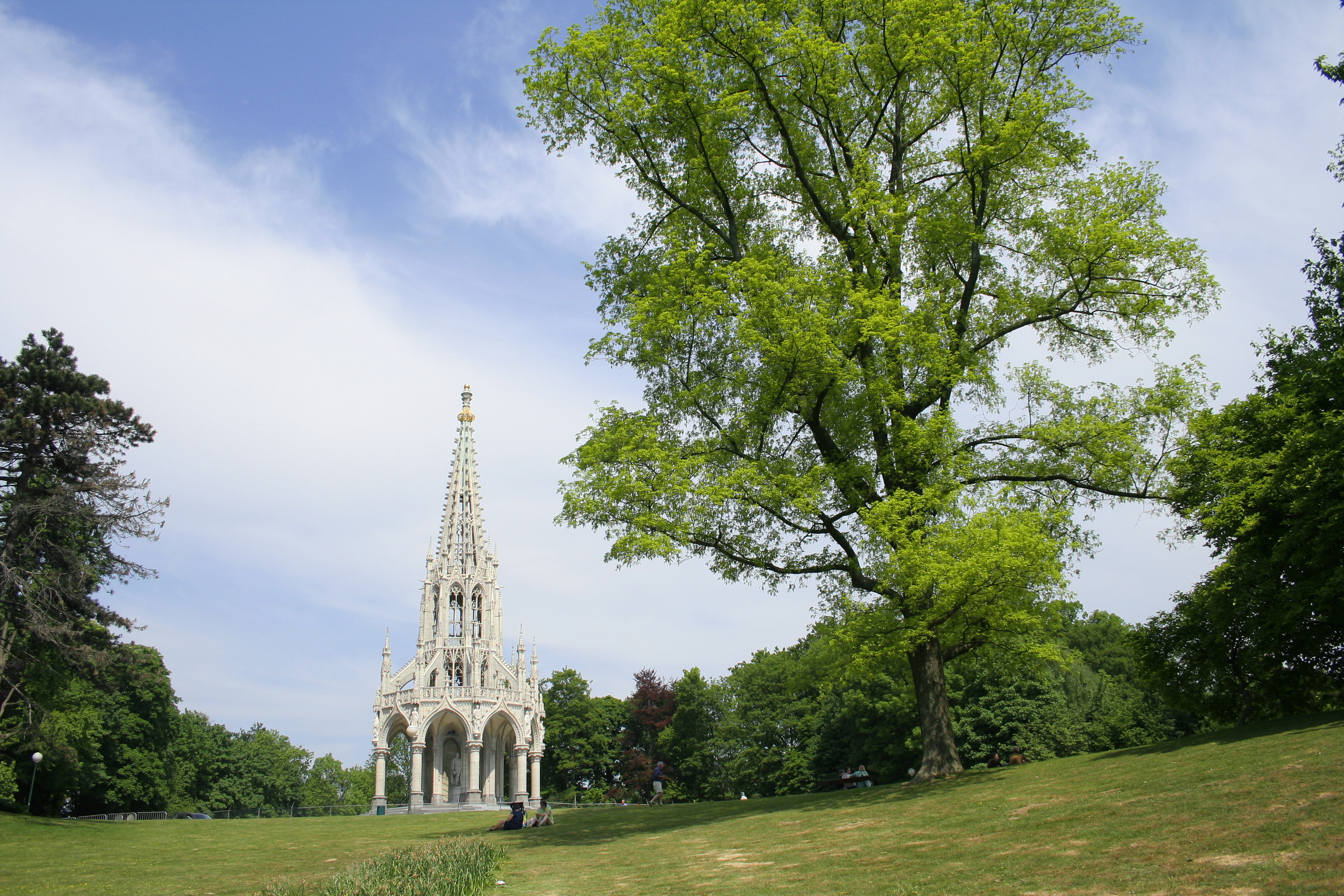
- Laeken Park with the Monument to the Dynasty in the background
- Interactive map of Laeken Park
- Type: Public park
- Location: Laeken, City of Brussels, Brussels-Capital Region, Belgium
- Coordinates: 50°53′33″N 4°20′55″E
- Public transit: 6 Stuyvenbergh

Laeken Park (French: Parc de Laeken, pronounced [paʁk də lakœn]) or Laken Park (Dutch: Park van Laken, pronounced [ˈpɑr(ə)k fɑɱ ˈlaːkə(n)]) is an urban public park in Laeken, in the north-west of the City of Brussels, Belgium. It is part of a vast landscaped complex including the Royal Domain and several surrounding parks.

== See also ==
- List of parks and gardens in Brussels
- History of Brussels
- Belgium in the long nineteenth century
