= Émile Sacré =

Belgian painter

- Born: Émile Sacré; 1844; Belgium
- Died: 1882 (aged 37–38) n/a
- Occupation: Painter

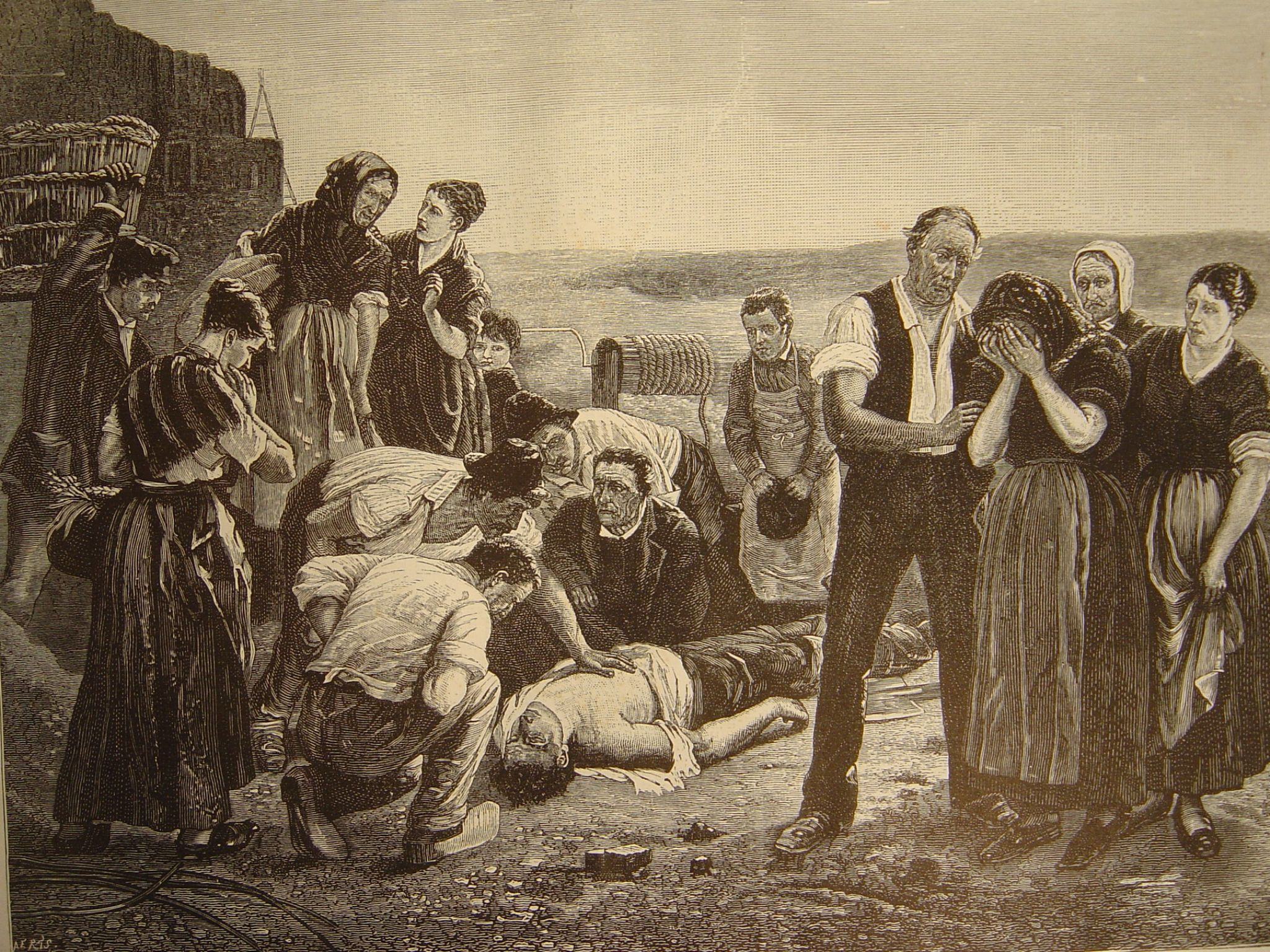
The Death of the Well-Digger

Émile Sacré (1844–1882) was a Belgian painter, after whom the Prix Émile Sacré was named.

Émile Sacré's father was Auguste Sacré, an engineer who had invented a machine dividing the bast of hemp and flax with a hatchel (hackle) to make it safe to be spun, and who was manager of the Société de Saint-Gilles linen mill near Brussels. Sacré studied at the Académie royale des beaux-arts de Bruxelles from 1866 to 1870 and with the architect Jean-Pierre Cluysenaer. He died at the age of 38. His brother established a triennial prize, along with the Prix Auguste Sacré for engineering in memory of the brothers' father, in a legacy of 1904. The sculptor Charles Van Der Stappen (1843–1910) made a bronze of Émile Sacré which was presented at the exhibition of Les XX in 1884.
