= Třebovice (Ostrava) =

Borough of Ostrava, Czech Republic

- Borough of Ostrava
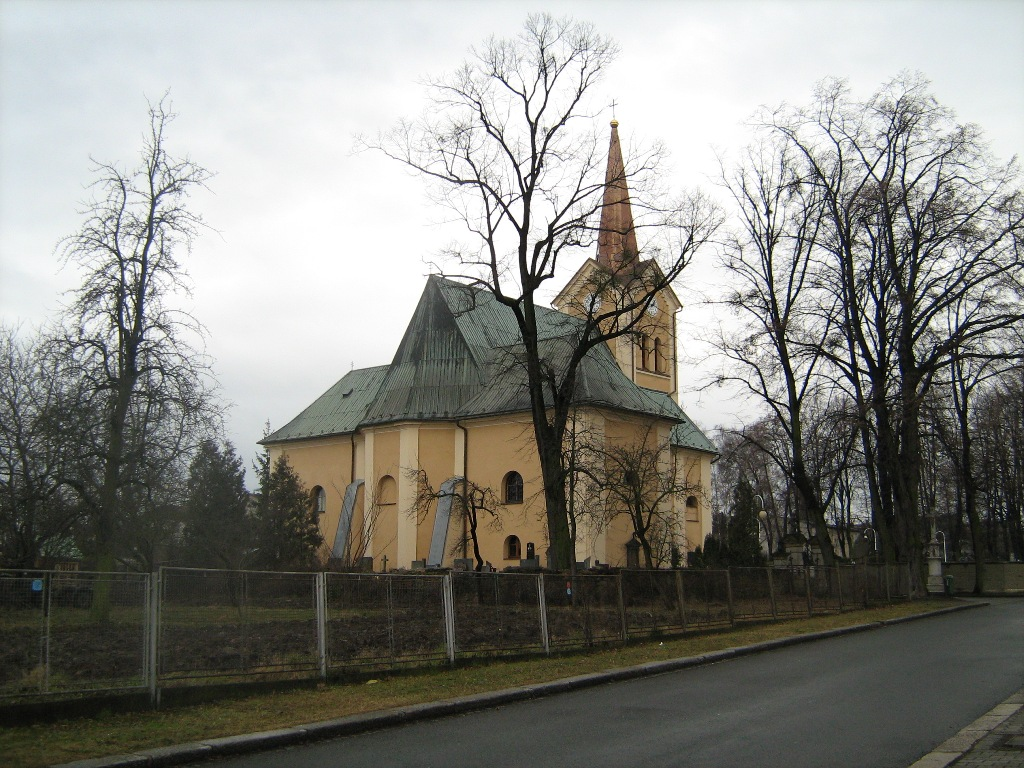
- Church of the Assumption of the Virgin Mary

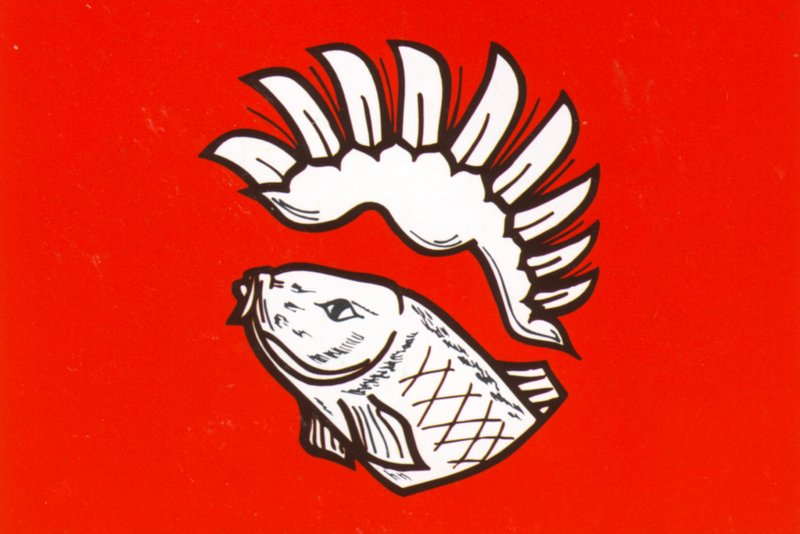
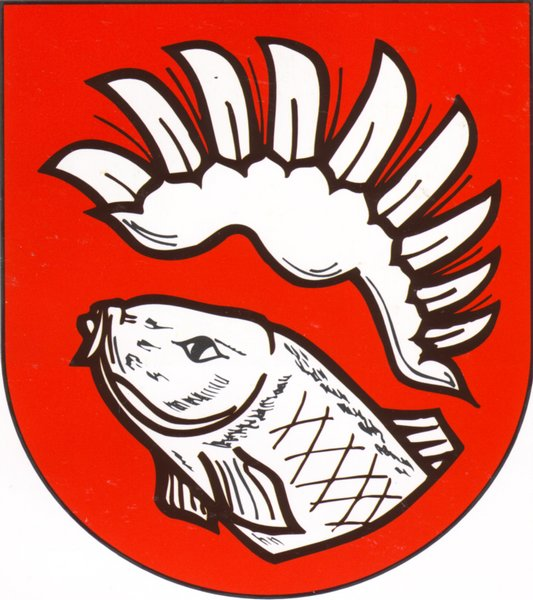
- Flag Coat of arms

- Location of Třebovice in Ostrava
- Coordinates: 49°50′5″N 18°11′41″E
- Country: Czech Republic
- Region: Moravian-Silesian
- Municipality: Ostrava

Area
  - Total: 2.82 km^{2} (1.09 sq mi)

Population (2021)
  - Total: 1,828
  - Density: 648/km^{2} (1,680/sq mi)
- Time zone: UTC+1 (CET)
  - Summer (DST): UTC+2 (CEST)
- Postal code: 722 00
- Website: trebovice.ostrava.cz

Třebovice is a borough and municipal part of the city of Ostrava in the Czech Republic. It is situated in the north-central part of the city, on the right bank of the Opava River. Originally a separate municipality, it was incorporated into Ostrava in 1958, as a part of the Poruba borough. On 24 November 1990, it was separated from Poruba and became one of the 23 self-governing boroughs of Ostrava. The confluence of the Opava and Oder rivers is located in the borough, on the border with Hošťálkovice.

== Etymology ==
The name Třebovice is presumably derived from the Old Czech verb třiebiti, which means 'to clear the forest'.

== Gallery ==
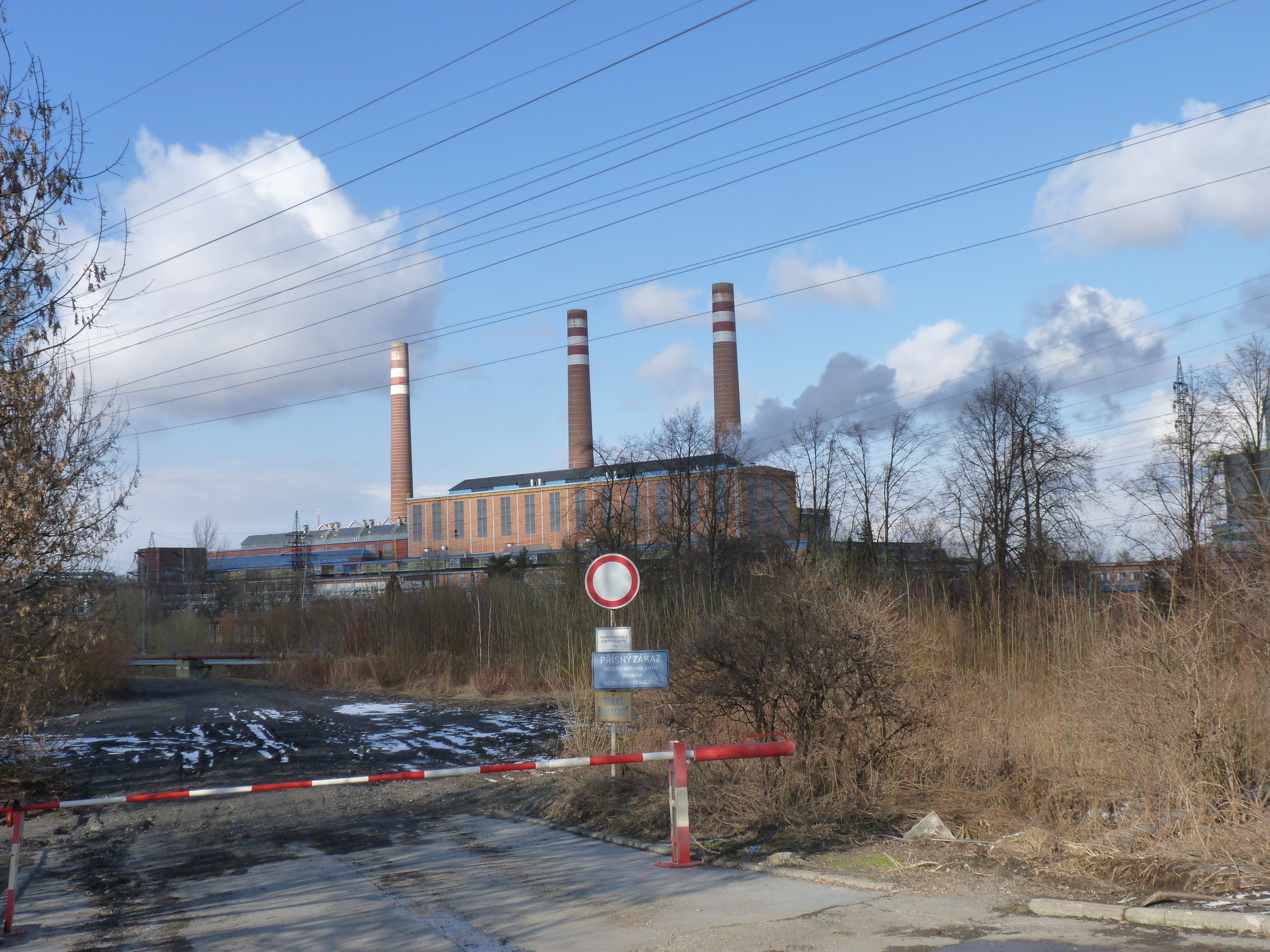
Thermal power plant

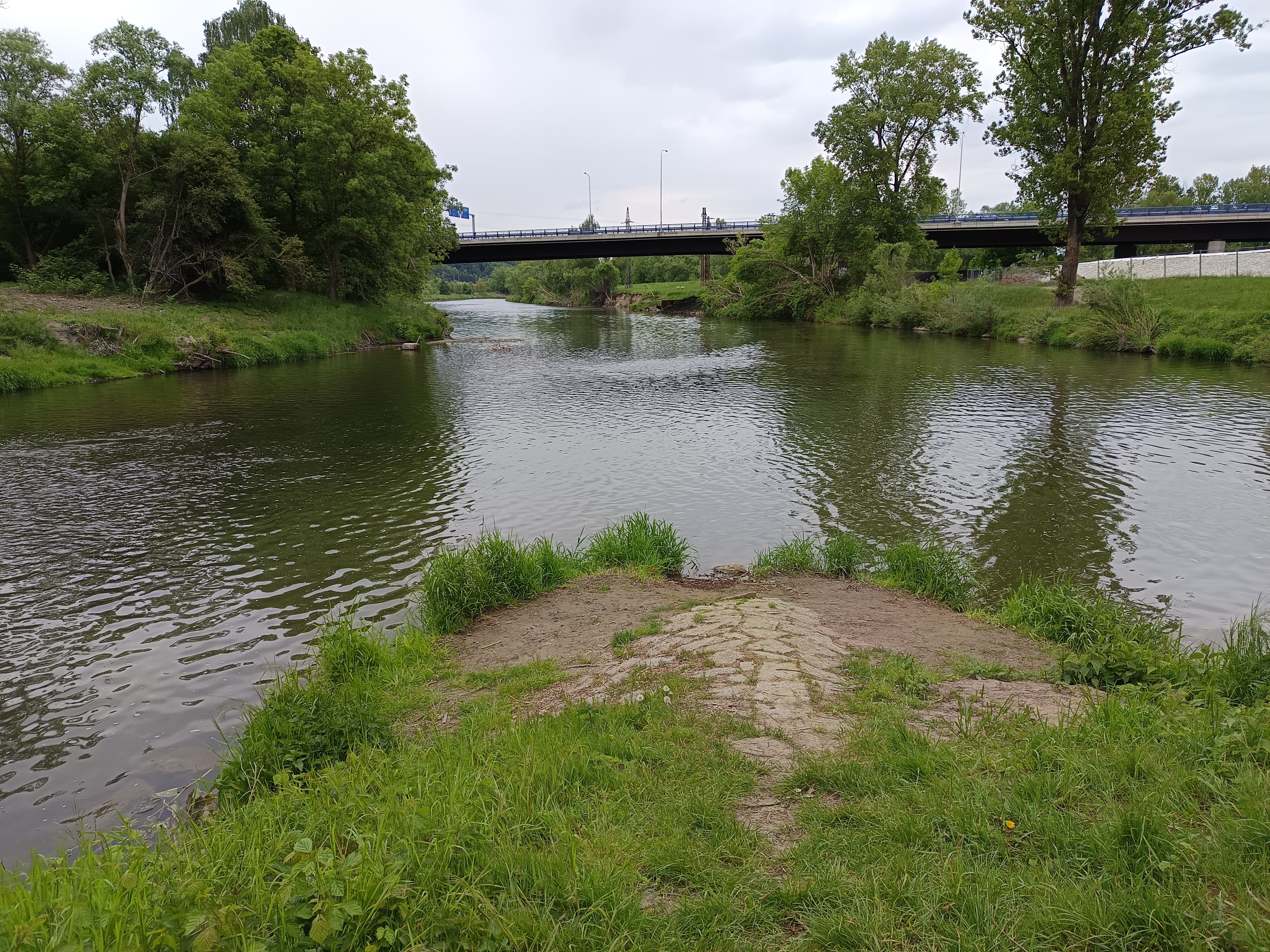
Confluence of Oder and Opava rivers

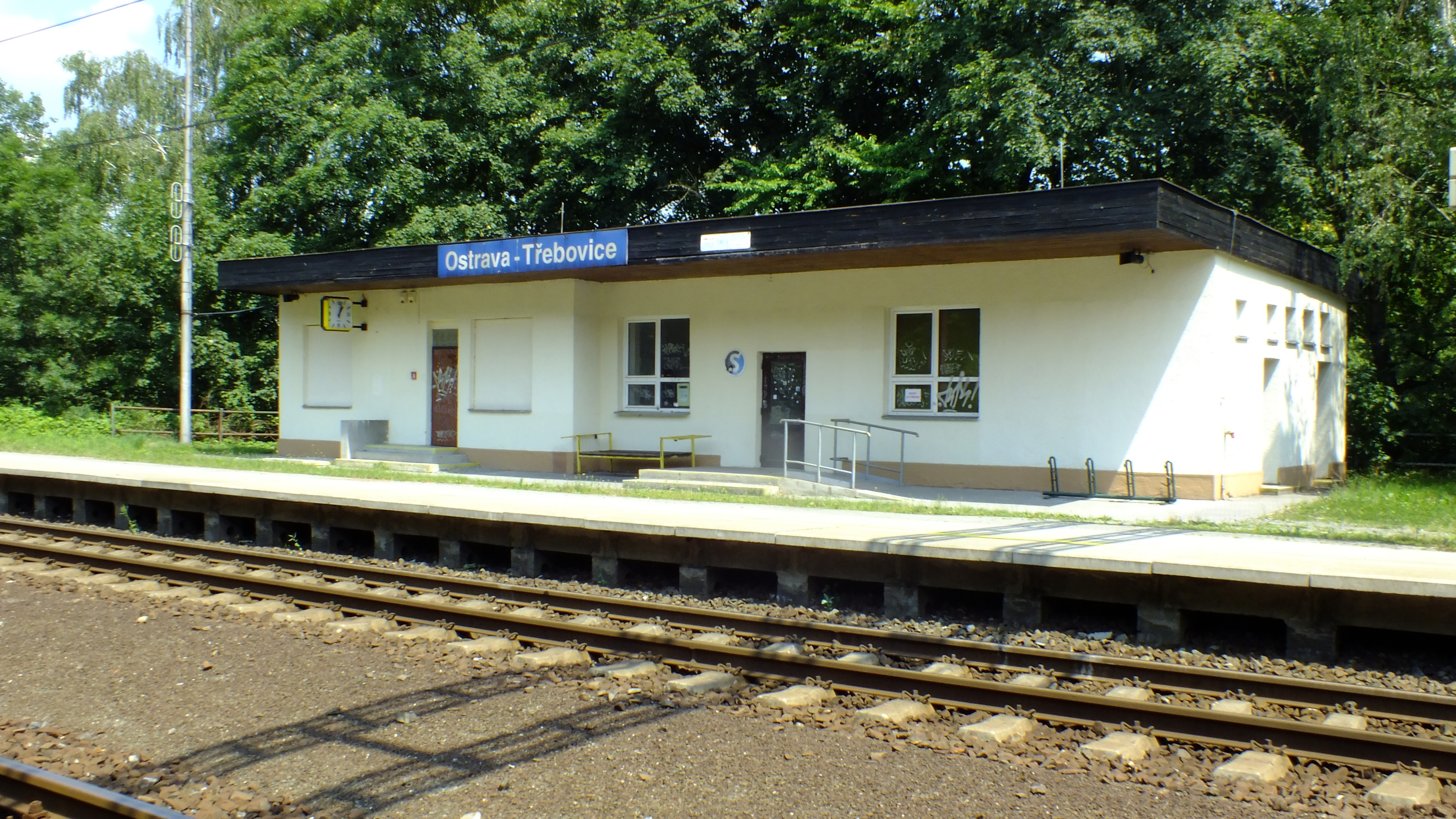
Train station
