= Veronika Neugebauer =

German actress (1968–2009)

- Born: Veronika Aryana Neugebauer; 27 November 1968; Munich, West Germany
- Died: 11 October 2009 (aged 40); Munich, Germany
- Occupation: Actress
- Years active: 1974–2009
- Father: Hartmut Neugebauer

Veronika Aryana Neugebauer (27 November 1968 – 11 October 2009) was a German actress who specialized in dubbing.

Neugebauer was born in Munich to voice actor Hartmut Neugebauer. She was best known for dubbing Ash Ketchum in the German-Language dub of Pokémon. She has also dubbed Neve Campbell in some of her movies.

After a prolonged illness, Neugebauer died on 11 October 2009 at aged 40, after a long battle with colorectal cancer.

== Roles ==
=== Television animation ===
- Pokémon (Ash Ketchum (Rica Matsumoto)), Season 4 through Season 11
- Sailor Moon (Sailor Jupiter (Emi Shinohara))

=== Theatrical animation ===
- Paprika (Doctor Atsuko "Paprika" Chiba (Megumi Hayashibara))
- Perfect Blue (Rei (Shiho Niiyama))
- Pokémon 4Ever (Ash Ketchum (Rica Matsumoto))
- Pokémon Heroes (Ash Ketchum (Rica Matsumoto))
- Pokémon: Jirachi Wish Maker (Ash Ketchum (Rica Matsumoto))

=== Live action ===
- Big Fish (Mildred (Missi Pyle))
- The Blair Witch Project (Heather (Heather Donahue))
- DOA: Dead or Alive (Kasumi (Devon Aoki))
- Ed Wood (Kathy O'Hara (Patricia Arquette))
- Lost & Delirious (Pauline Oster (Piper Perabo))
- Men in Black II (Hailey (Colombe Jacobsen-Derstine))
- Mr. Deeds (Babe Bennet/Pam Dawson (Winona Ryder))
- Panic (Sarah Cassidy (Neve Campbell))
- Payback (Pearl (Lucy Liu))
- Scream trilogy (Sidney Prescott (Neve Campbell))
- Three to Tango (Amy Post (Neve Campbell))
- Wild Things (Suzie Marie Toller (Neve Campbell))
- Wild Things: Diamonds in the Rough (Marie Clifton (Sarah Laine))
