= Étienne-François Gebauer =

French composer and flautist (1776–1823)

Étienne-François Gebauer (7 March 1776 – 1823) was a French composer and flautist.

== Biography ==
Born in Versailles, the son of a German regimental musician, Étienne-François Gebauer was the brother of Michel-Joseph Gebauer, François-René Gebauer, Pierre-Paul Gebauer and Jean-Luc Gebauer, all musicians and composers.

He began his musical studies under the direction of his elder brother Michel-Joseph Gebauer and then received a formation to flute from Antoine Hugot. He entered the orchestra of the Opera-Comique in 1801 as second flute, then became first flute in 1813, but retired in 1822 for health reasons. He died in Paris a few months later.

As a composer, he wrote many works, especially for his instrument, the flute.

== Works ==
- 19 works of duets for 2 flutes
- several works of duets for 2 violins
- flute sonatas with bass accompaniment, Op. 8 and Op. 14
- more than 100 solos detached for solo flute, varied tunes, etc.
- gamut for flute followed by 18 arias
- varied tunes for clarinet
- 3 easy duets, for flute and violin, ed. Amadeus
- 12 variations on Que ne suis-je la fougère ?, for solo flute, ed. Billaudot
- Concert duo Op. 16 n° 3, for clarinet and violin, ed. Breitkopf & Härtel (Musica Rara)
- 3 duets Op. 24, for 2 flutes, ed. Universal Edition
- 6 easy duets Op. 4, for 2 flutes
- 6 duos of an easy-to-use version for beginners Op. 5, for 2 flutes
- 6 duos of an easy-to-use version for beginners Pp. 6, for 2 clarinets
- 6 flute sonatas with bass accompaniment Op. 8
- 6 duets Op. 9, for flute and violin
- 3 concertant duos Op. 11, for 2 clarinets
- 6 concertant duets Op. 16, for clarinet and violin
- 6 duets Op. 20, for 2 flutes
- 6 concertant duets Op. 21, for 2 flutes
- 6 easy and brilliant duets Op. 24, for 2 flutes

== Sources ==
- François-Joseph Fétis, Biographie universelle des musiciens, volume 3, Paris, Firmin-Didot, 1866, (p. 434).
