= Edwin Gebauer =

German politician

Edwin Gebauer (born 16 June 1884 in Borna - 1967, Potsdam) was a German politician and member of the Nazi Party.

From a rural background, Gebauer worked on the family poultry farm and at their forge before serving in the First World War with the Fuß-Artillerie-Regiment Nr. 12. He was awarded the Iron Cross Second Class and the Friedrich-August-Medal for his war service.

Gebauer became involved in rightist politics in 1924 and joined the Nazi Party at an unknown date. He became a leader in the Sturmabteilung in 1926, achieving the rank of SA-Sturmbannführer in 1931 and SA-Standartenführer in 1937.

In the July 1932 election to the Reichstag, Gebauer was elected to serve as a member for electoral constituency 3 (Potsdam II) representing the Nazis. He was not re-elected in November 1932 when the Nazis suffered a sizeable decline in their vote.
