= Richard A. Neubauer =

American physician

Richard Allen Neubauer (16 January 1924 – 11 June 2007), was an American physician known for his work in the use of hyperbaric oxygen therapy.

== Biography ==
Neubauer was born in Wilmington, Delaware, on January 16, 1924. He received his undergraduate education at the College of William and Mary, and his medical degree in 1947 at the University of Virginia. After first practicing in Wilmington and Philadelphia, he established a practice in internal medicine in Fort Lauderdale, Florida. He was Chief of Staff and Director of Medical Development at the Cleveland Clinic there, which he had helped found under the earlier name of Beach Hospital. He died on June 11, 2007.

== Professional work ==
Neubauer obtained a hyperbaric oxygen chamber in the early 1970s, and established and directed the Ocean Hyperbaric Neurologic Center in Lauderdale-by-the-Sea, Florida. He was an early user of hyperbaric oxygen therapy for multiple sclerosis, near drowning, cerebral palsy, traumatic brain injury, anoxic encephalopathy, coma, stroke, and the treatment of mitochondrial diseases in children.

== Publications ==
Neubauer was the co-author with Morton Walker of Hyperbaric Oxygen Therapy, and of Hyperbaric Oxygenation for Cerebral Palsy and the Brain-Injured Child: A Promising Treatment.

His most cited scientific article is "Hyperbaric Oxygenation As An Adjunct Therapy In Strokes Due To Thrombosis - A Review Of 122 Patients" by Neubauer RA, End E, Stroke. 1980 May-Jun;11(3):297-300.

== Honors ==
Neubauer was elected to the Royal Society of Medicine, and was a founder of the American College of Hyperbaric Medicine and a member of the World Federation of Neurology Executive Committee on Underwater Medicine.
