= Charles van der Stappen =

19th-century Belgian sculptor

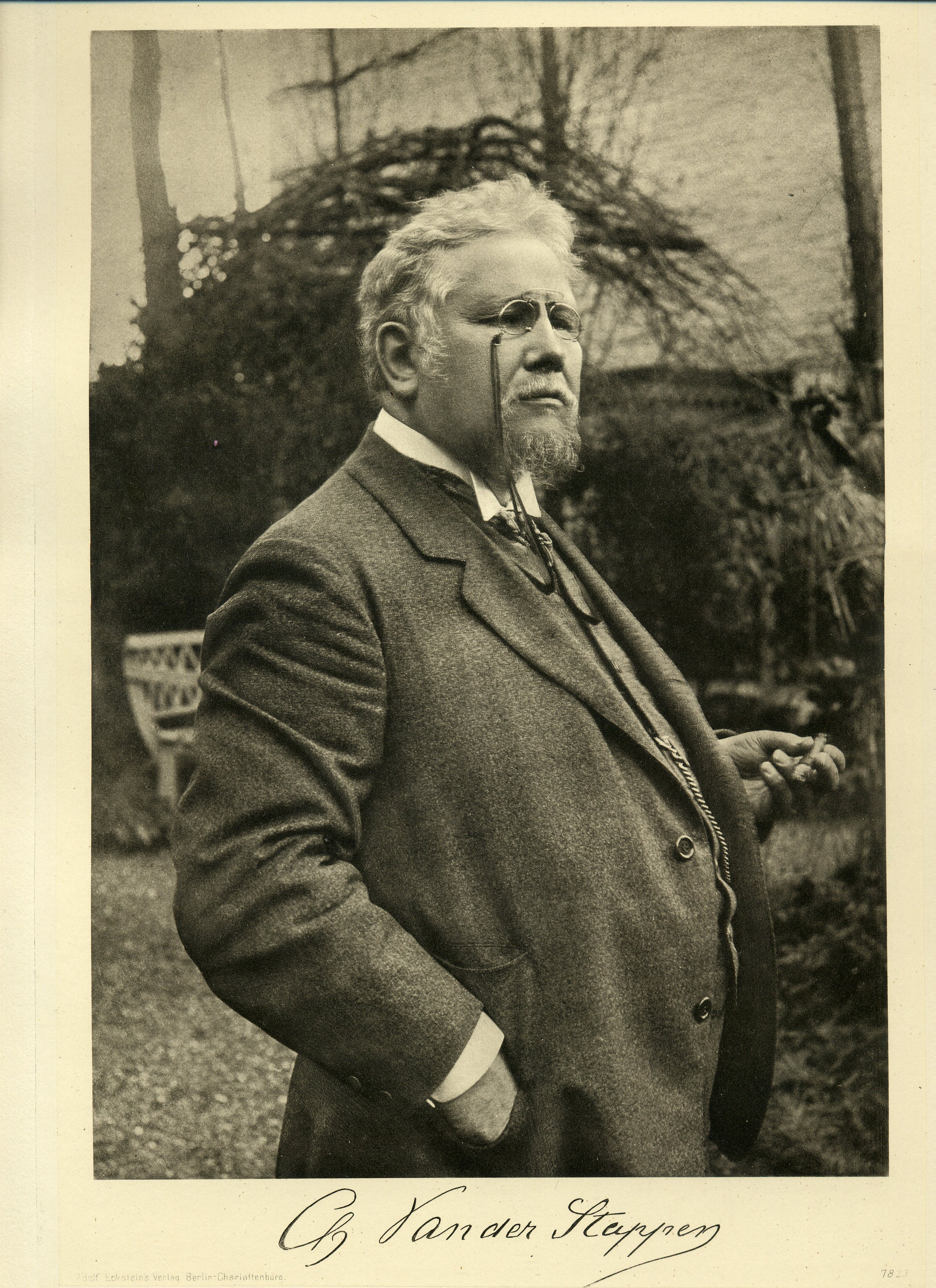

Charles van der Stappen (also Karl van der Stappen; 19 September 1843 – 21 October 1910), was a Belgian sculptor, born in Saint-Josse-ten-Noode.

== Life ==
Educated at the Académie Royale des Beaux-Arts in Brussels (1859–1868), van der Stappen's contribution to the Brussels Salon was "The Faun's Toilet" of 1869, and thereafter he began to produce work of a high and novel order in every class of sculpture, and soon, along with Paul de Vigne, became recognized as the leader of the section of the new Belgian school of sculpture which infused models derived from Greek and Roman models and the art of the Italian Renaissance with naturalistic detail and fleeting action.

His best-known funeral monuments are those to Alexandre Gendebien (1874) and Baron Coppens, at Sheel (1875). His statues include William the Silent, set up at the Petit Sablon Square, and two in the Brussels Museum, The Man with the Sword, and "The Sphinx". The bronze group Ompdrailles was acquired by the Belgian government (1892).

In 1893 the sculptor began his collaboration with Constantin Meunier for the elaborate decoration of the Botanical Garden of Brussels, coordinating many other sculptors for the production of some 52 sculptures for its grounds. The result of the connection may be seen in the group The Builders of Cities which is strongly imbued with the feeling and types of Meunier's sympathetic figures of workers.

Among his students were Ilse Twardowski-Conrat, Helene Zelezny-Scholz, Rik Wouters, Paul Du Bois, João Turin, and Victor Rousseau, who would succeed him as director of the Académie Royale des Beaux-Arts.

His student Ilse Twardowski-Conrat received the commission for his funerary monument after he died in 1910.

== Work ==
- Decoration on the Palais des Postes, Brussels, 1872
- Statues for the Alhambra Theatre, Brussels, 1874
- Caryatides for the house of the Ghent architect Louis de Curte (1817–1891), 1874
- Pediment sculpture Orchestration, one of the five pediment sculptures at the Royal Conservatory of Brussels, for architect Jean-Pierre Cluysenaer, 1875
- Noble bronze group, The Teaching of Art, on the facade of the Palace of Fine Arts, Brussels, 1880
- Bronze of the painter Émile Sacré which was presented at the exhibition of Les XX in 1884
- St. Michael, for the Gothic Hall of the Town Hall, Brussels, 1885
- La Mort d'Ompdrailles monument, Brussels, depicting characters from novelist Leon Cladel, with base by architect Victor Horta, 1895–1897
- Bronze monument to painter Théodore Baron (1840–1899), Namur, 1903
- Figures of Antwerp and Liège for the arches of the Cinquantenaire, circa 1905

== Gallery ==
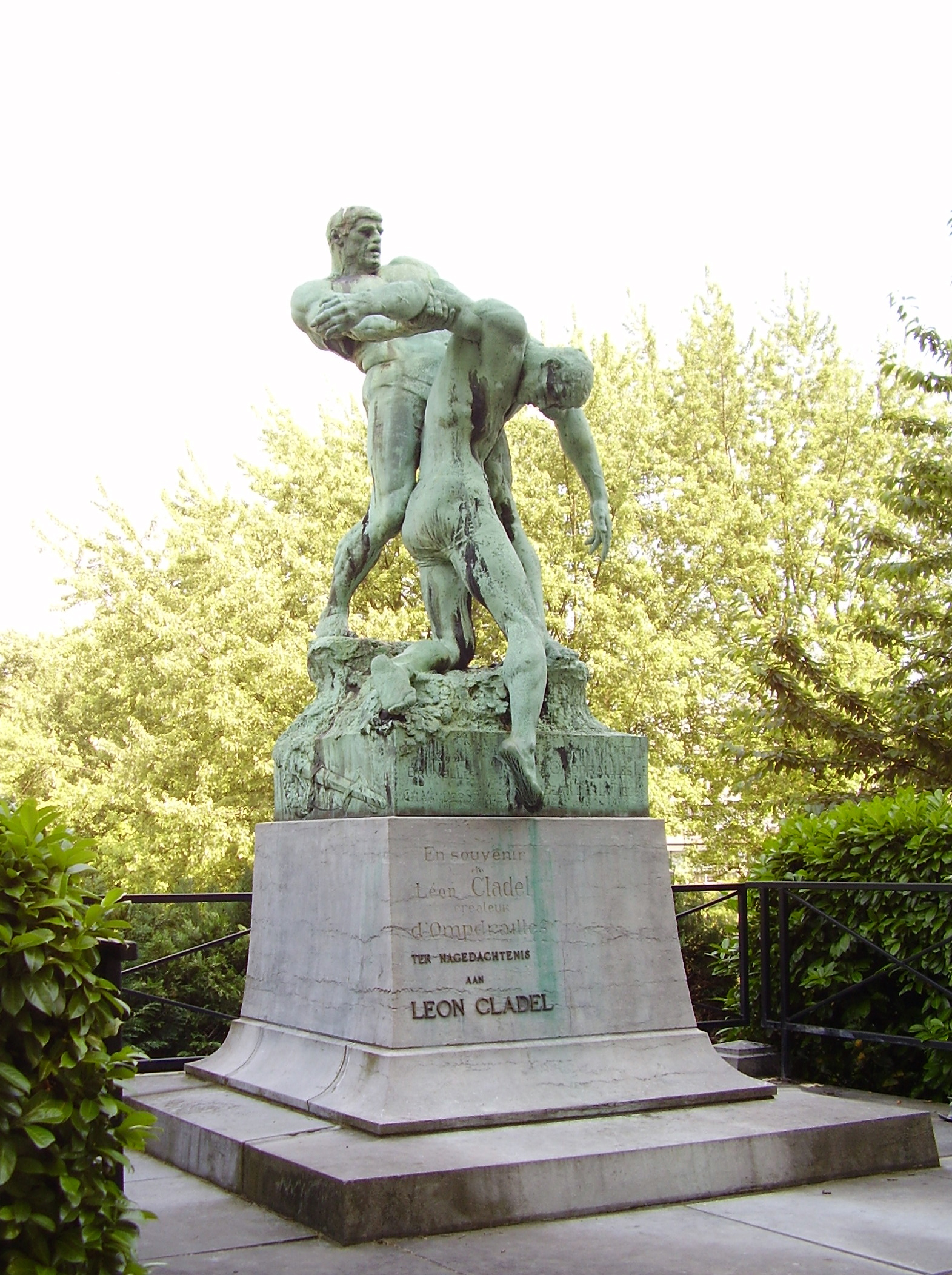
Mort d'Ompdrailles

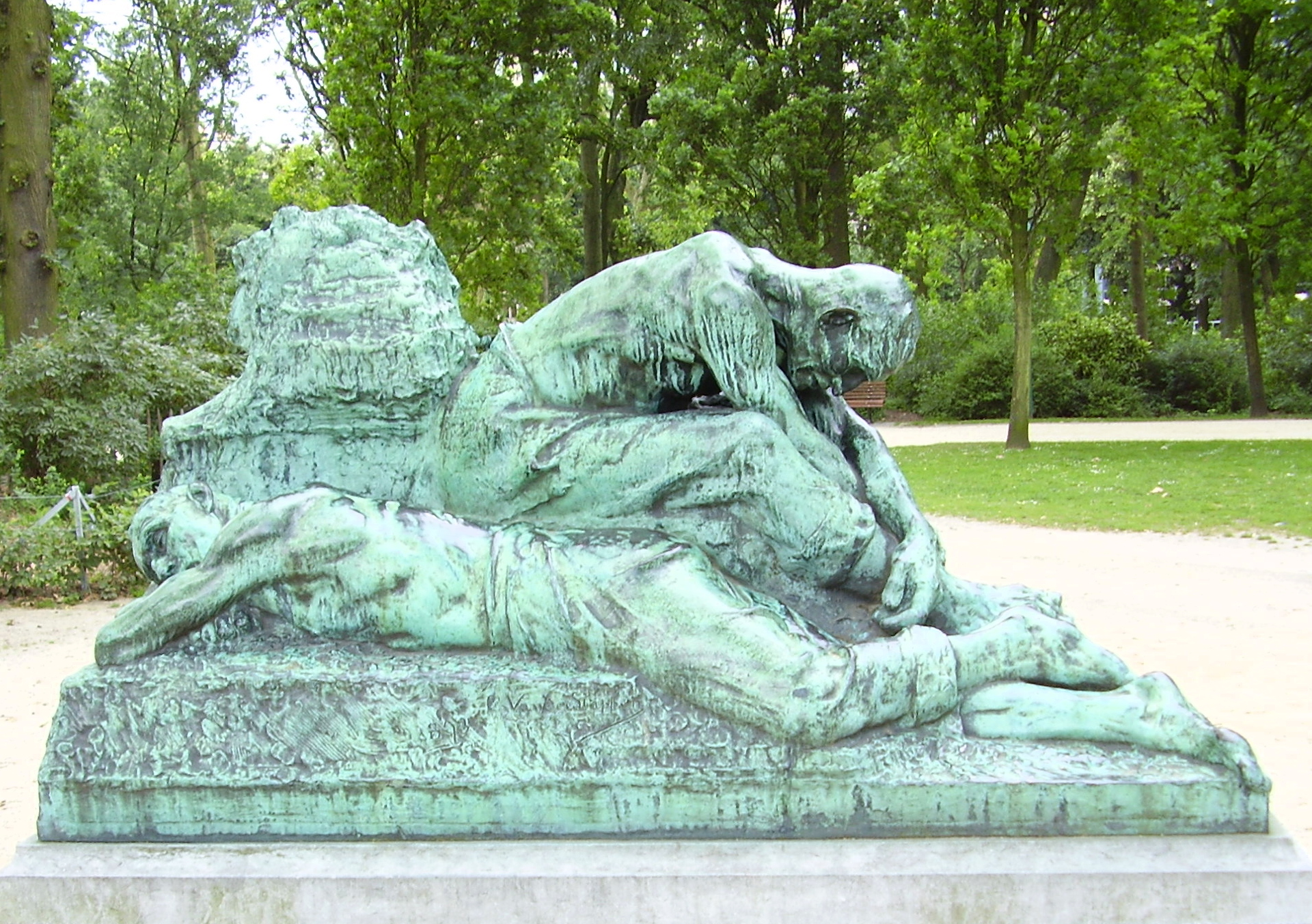
Bâtisseurs de ville

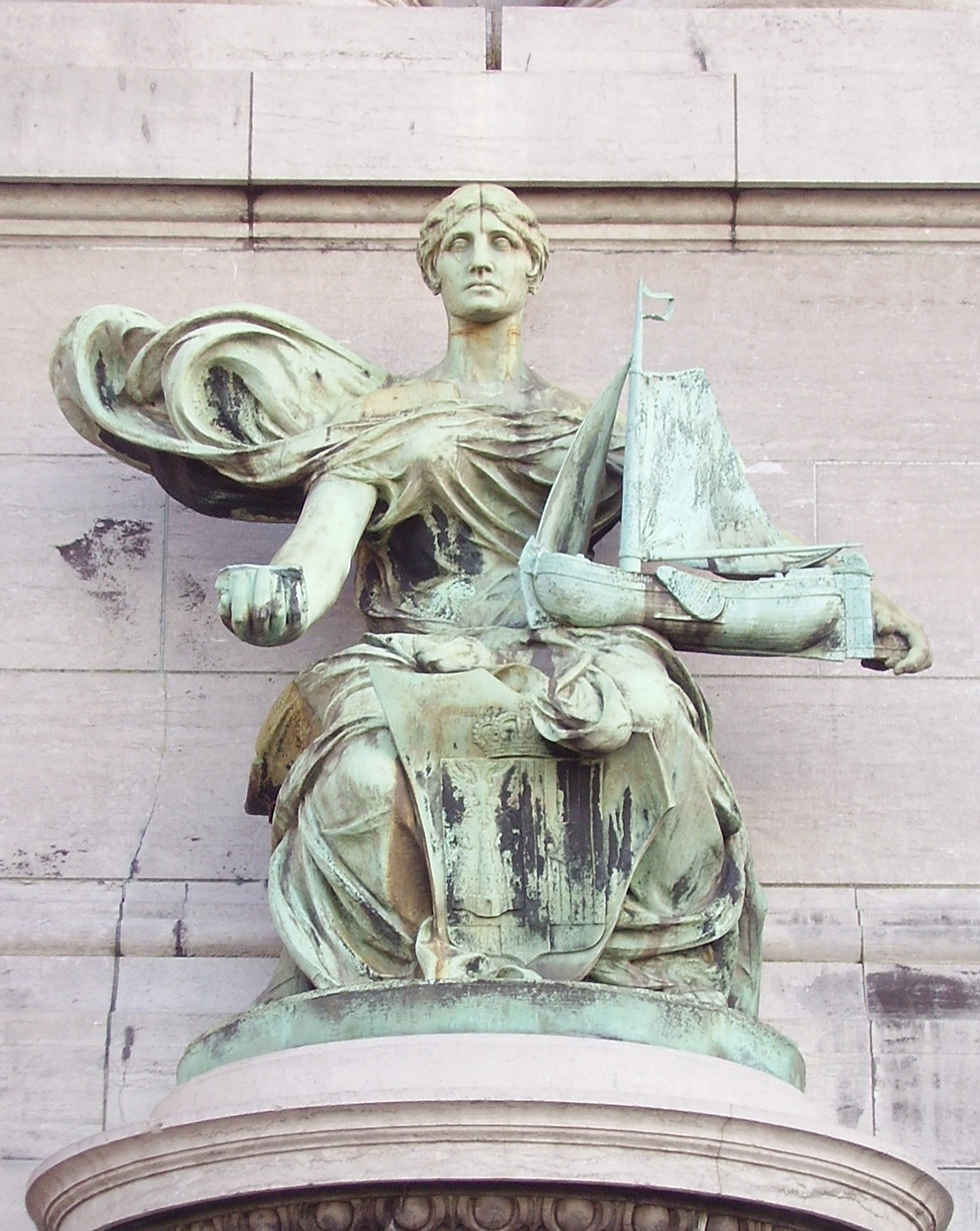
Arcades Cinquantenaire (Brussels) Anvers

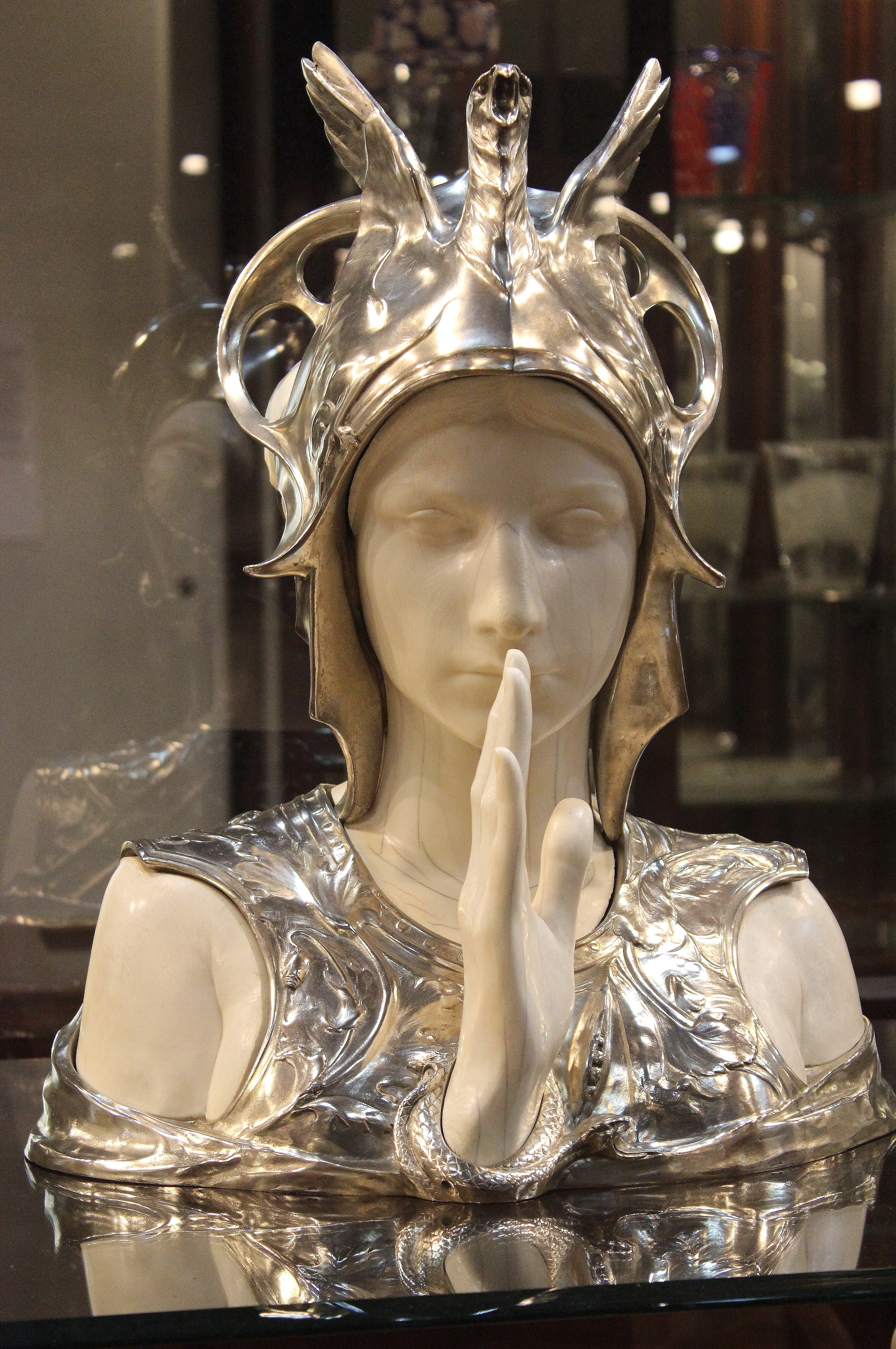
Le Sphinx mystérieux

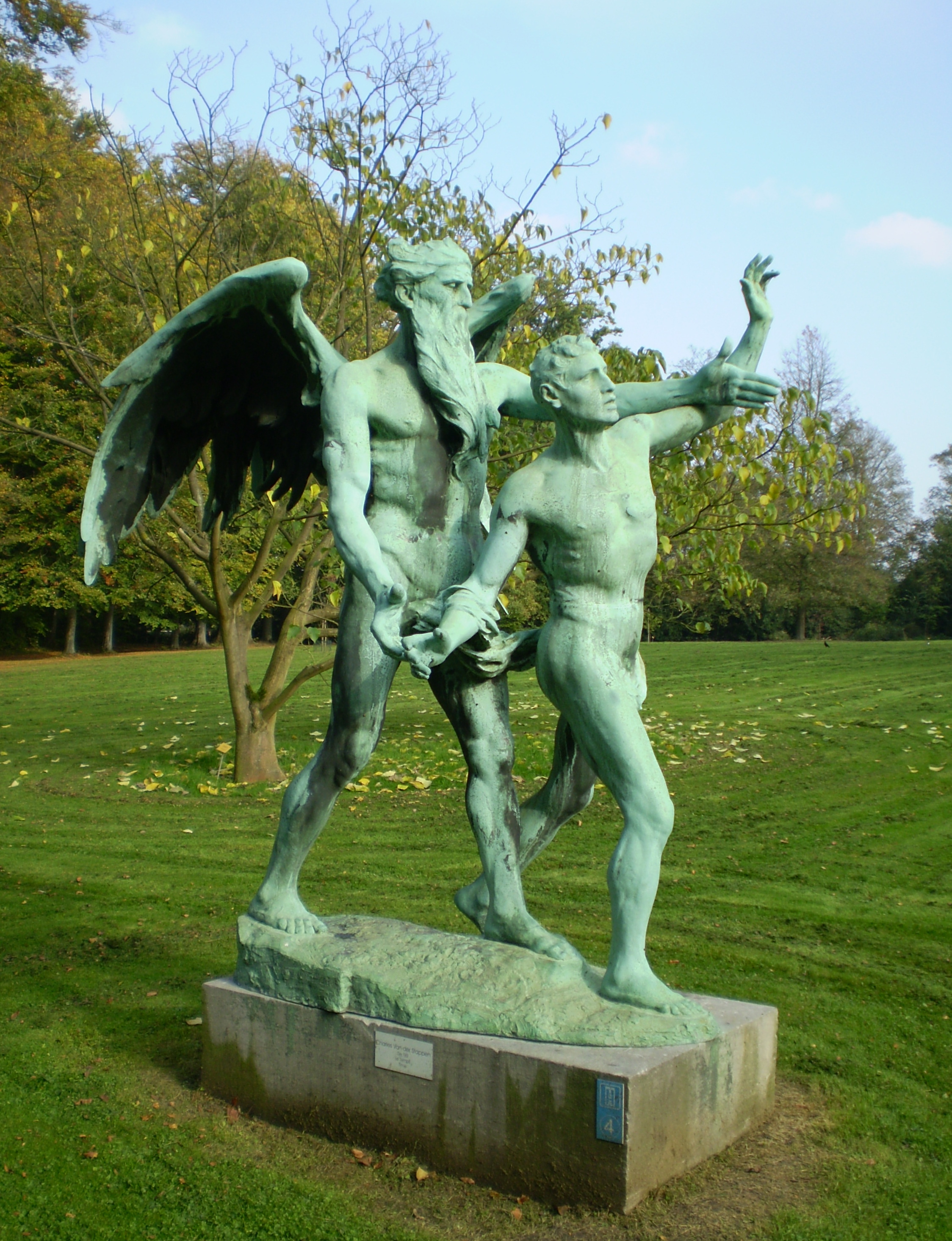
Time, bronze (Jardin Botanique National de Belgique, Meise)

== Sources ==
- Charles van der Stappen, by Camille Lemonnier;
- Les Artistes belges contemporains, by E.L. de Taye;
- The Renaissance of Sculpture in Belgium, by OG Destrée (London, 1895).
