= Michel-Joseph Gebauer =

French oboist, violinist, viol player, bandmaster, and composer

Michel-Joseph Gebauer (1763 or 3 May 1765 – December 1812) was a French oboist, violinist, viol player, bandmaster, and composer.

Gebauer was born in La Fère in Aisne. He became an oboist in the Royal Swiss Guard at the age of 14, as well as becoming expert at both the violin and viol. In 1791 he became oboist in the Garde Nationale, and in 1794 professor at the Conservatoire de Paris, where he stayed until 1802. Thereafter he served as bandmaster of the Consular Guard and of its successor the Imperial Guard. He accompanied the army during a number of campaigns, during which he studied and incorporated elements from German military music. He died while accompanying the Grande Armée on its disastrous invasion of Russia, during the retreat from Moscow.

He composed over 200 popular marches, as well as a number of other pieces for various instruments, particularly duets and quartets. He had three brothers, all musicians: the composer and bassoonist François René Gebauer, Pierre-Paul Gebauer, Jean-Luc Gebauer, and the flautist Étienne-François Gebauer.
