= Katharina Gebauer =

German politician (born 1987)

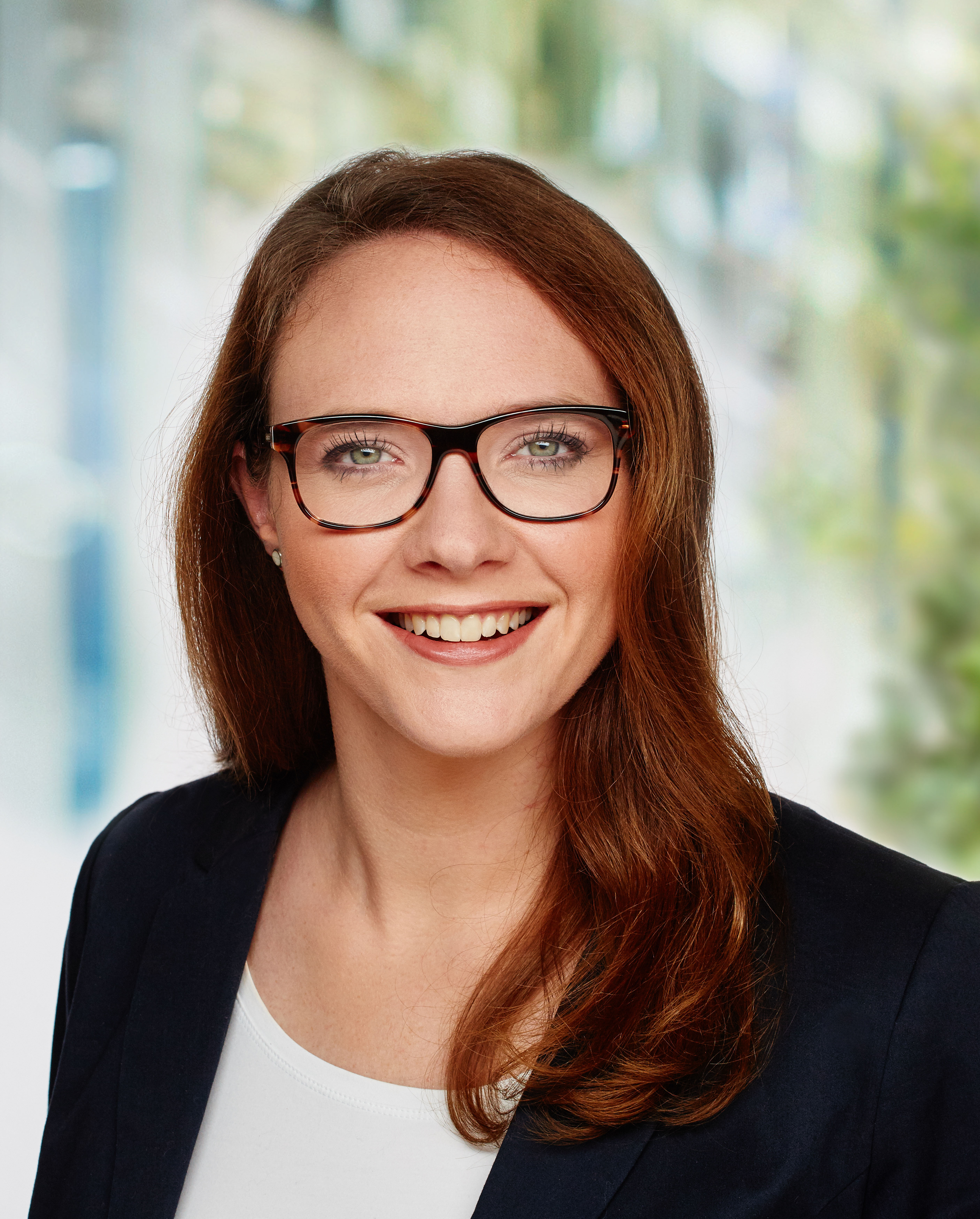
- Gebauer in 2021

Member of the Landtag of North Rhine-Westphalia
- Incumbent
- Assumed office 1 June 2017
- Preceded by: Achim Tüttenberg
- Constituency: Rhein-Sieg-Kreis IV

Personal details
- Born: 6 August 1987 (age 38) Troisdorf
- Party: Christian Democratic Union (since 2010)

Katharina Gebauer (born 6 August 1987 in Troisdorf) is a German politician serving as a member of the Landtag of North Rhine-Westphalia since 2017. She has served as group leader of the Christian Democratic Union in the city council of Troisdorf since 2020.
