= Hartmut Neugebauer =

German actor (1942–2017)

- Born: 2 September 1942; Zirke, Germany
- Died: 22 June 2017 (aged 74); Munich, Germany
- Occupation: Actor

Hartmut Neugebauer (2 September 1942 – 22 June 2017) was a German actor and dialogue director.

He was the German dub-over voice of actors Gene Hackman, John Goodman and Robbie Coltrane. He was the father of the late voice actress Veronika Neugebauer (1968–2009).

== Selected filmography ==
=== Film ===
- Angel Baby (1968) – Hans-Jürgen Hoffmann
- The Stuff That Dreams Are Made Of (1972) – Drunken Visitor at Reeperbahn Brothel (voice, uncredited)
- Liebe durch die Autotür (1972) – Scheich (voice, uncredited)
- Laß jucken Kumpel 2. Teil: Das Bullenkloster (1973) – Fahrer (uncredited)
- Die Stoßburg (1974) – Kochen
- Charley's Nieces (1974) – Knall
- Champagner aus dem Knobelbecher (1975) – Hartmann
- Mein Onkel Theodor oder Wie man viel Geld im Schlaf verdient (1975) – Mann am Fenster (uncredited)
- Albino (1976) – Sergeant Major Sam (voice, uncredited)
- Nackt und heiß auf Mykonos (1979) – Rennfahrer (voice)
- Die Brut des Bösen (1979) – Alberto Ramirez / Takimura (voice, uncredited)
- Gefangene Frauen (1980) – Man (voice, uncredited)
- Die Todesgöttin des Liebescamps (1981) – Tanga (voice, uncredited)
- Code Name: Wild Geese (1984) – Walter Brenner
- Macho Man (1985) – Andreas Arnold / DJ (voice, uncredited)
- The Treasure of Swamp Castle (1985) – (German version, voice)
- Asterix and the Big Fight (1989) – Zenturio (German version, voice)
- Langer Samstag (1992)
- Pepolino and the Treasure of the Mermaid (1996) – Captain Babaluk (voice)
- Jester Till (2003) – Stadtwache und Conferencier (voice)
- Knight Rusty (2013) – König Bleifuß der Verbogene (voice)

=== Television animation ===
- Saber Rider and the Star Sheriffs (Nemesis (Peter Cullen))
- Sonic X (Doctor Eggman (Chikao Ōtsuka))
- Count Duckula (Nanny (Brian Trueman))

=== Theatrical animation ===
- Asterix and Cleopatra (Pyradonis (Bernard Lavalette))
- Asterix and the Big Fight (Zenturio (Roger Lumont))
- Asterix Conquers America (Zenturio (Yves Pignot))
- Asterix in Britain (Motus (Nicolas Silberg))
- Cars (Mack (John Ratzenberger))
- Home on the Range (Alameda Slim (Randy Quaid))
- The Incredibles (The Underminer (John Ratzenberger))
- The Little Mermaid (Scuttle (Buddy Hackett), 1998 dub)
- Perfect Blue (Cham manager)
- Ratatouille (Mustafa (John Ratzenberger))
- Toy Story (Mr. Potato Head (Don Rickles))
- Toy Story 2 (Mr. Potato Head (Don Rickles))
- The Twelve Tasks of Asterix (Zenturio (Jacques Hilling))

=== Video games ===
- Sonic the Hedgehog series (2011–2017) (Doctor Eggman)

=== Dubbing roles ===
- Harry Potter film series (Rubeus Hagrid (Robbie Coltrane))
- The Santa Clause 2 (Tooth Fairy (Art LaFleur))
- The Santa Clause 3: The Escape Clause (Tooth Fairy (Art LaFleur))
- The Texas Chainsaw Massacre (Sheriff Hoyt (R. Lee Ermey))
