= Josef Gebauer =

Czech historian and archivist (1942–2004)

Josef Gebauer (7 August 1942 in Prague – 19 May 2004 in Opava) was a Czech historian and archivist.

Since 1972 until his death he worked in Provincial Archive of Czech Silesia (Zemský archív) in Opava. His specialisation was to deal with historical documents related to agriculture and forestry.

Gebauer frequently published articles about Silesian history in local newspapers (e.g. in Naše Opavsko). In September 2004, he was awarded (in memoriam) by the municipality of Opava for popularisation of history of the city.
