= Nonlinear resonance =

Physical phenomenon

In physics, nonlinear resonance is the occurrence of resonance in a nonlinear system. In nonlinear resonance the system behaviour – resonance frequencies and modes – depends on the amplitude of the oscillations, while for linear systems this is independent of amplitude. The mixing of modes in non-linear systems is termed resonant interaction.

== Description ==
Generically two types of resonances have to be distinguished – linear and nonlinear. From the physical point of view, they are defined by whether or not external force coincides with the eigen-frequency of the system (linear and nonlinear resonance correspondingly). Vibrational modes can interact in a resonant interaction when both the energy and momentum of the interacting modes is conserved. The conservation of energy implies that the sum of the frequencies of the modes must sum to zero:

$$\omega_n=\omega_{1}+ \omega_{2}+ \cdots + \omega_{n-1},$$

with possibly different $\omega_i=\omega(\mathbf{k}_i),$ being eigen-frequencies of the linear part of some nonlinear partial differential equation. The $\mathbf{k}_i$ is the wave vector associated with a mode; the integer subscripts $i$ being indexes into Fourier harmonics – or eigenmodes – see Fourier series. Accordingly, the frequency resonance condition is equivalent to a Diophantine equation with many unknowns. The problem of finding their solutions is equivalent to the Hilbert's tenth problem that is proven to be algorithmically unsolvable.

Main notions and results of the theory of nonlinear resonances are:

1. The use of dispersion relations $\omega=\omega(\mathbf{k})$ appearing in various physical applications allows finding the solutions of the frequency resonance condition.
2. The set of resonances for a given dispersion function and the form of resonance conditions is partitioned into non-intersecting resonance clusters; dynamics of each cluster can be studied independently (at the appropriate time-scale). These are often called "bound waves", which cannot interact, as opposed to the "free waves", which can. A famous example is the soliton of the KdV equation: solitons can move through each other, without interacting. When decomposed into eigenmodes, the higher frequency modes of the soliton do not interact (do not satisfy the equations of the resonant interaction), they are "bound" to the fundamental.
3. Each collection of bound modes (resonance cluster) can be represented by its NR-diagram which is a plane graph of the special structure. This representation allows to reconstruct uniquely 3a) dynamical system describing time-dependent behavior of the cluster, and 3b) the set of its polynomial conservation laws; these are generalization of Manley–Rowe constants of motion for the simplest clusters (triads and quartets).
4. Dynamical systems describing some types of the clusters can be solved analytically; these are the exactly solvable models.
5. These theoretical results can be used directly for describing real-life physical phenomena (e.g. intraseasonal oscillations in the Earth's atmosphere) or various wave turbulent regimes in the theory of wave turbulence. Many more examples are provided in the article on resonant interactions.

== Nonlinear resonance shift ==
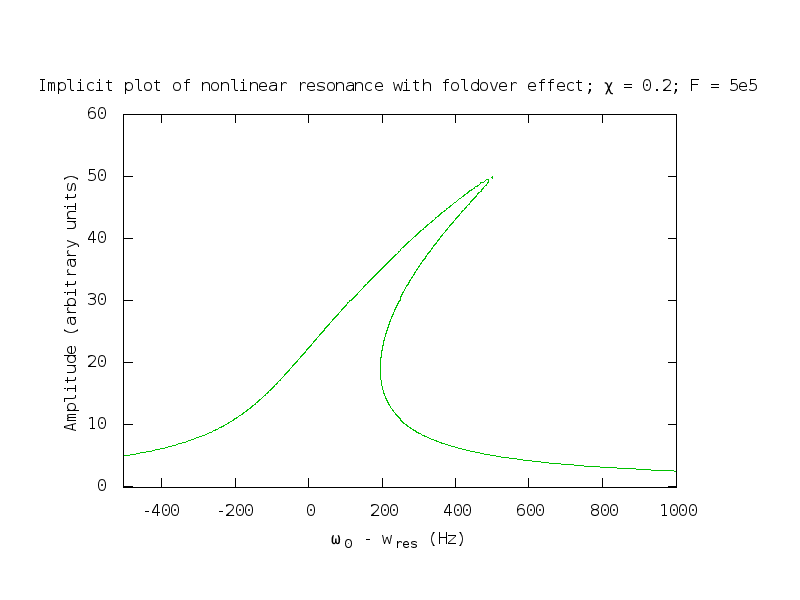
Foldover effect

Nonlinear effects may significantly modify the shape of the resonance curves of harmonic oscillators. First of all, the resonance frequency $\omega$ is shifted from its "natural" value $\omega_0$ according to the formula

$$\omega=\omega_0+\kappa A^2,$$

where $A$ is the oscillation amplitude and $\kappa$ is a constant defined by the anharmonic coefficients. Second, the shape of the resonance curve is distorted (foldover effect). When the amplitude of the (sinusoidal) external force $F$ reaches a critical value $F_\mathrm{crit}$ instabilities appear. The critical value is given by the formula

$$F_\mathrm{crit}=\frac{4 m^2\omega_0^2\gamma^3}{3\sqrt{3}\kappa},$$

where $m$ is the oscillator mass and $\gamma$ is the damping coefficient. Furthermore, new resonances appear in which oscillations of frequency close to $\omega_0$ are excited by an external force with frequency quite different from $\omega_0.$

=== Nonlinear frequency response functions ===
Generalized frequency response functions, and nonlinear output frequency response functions allow the user to study complex nonlinear behaviors in the frequency domain in a principled way. These functions reveal resonance ridges, harmonic, inter modulation, and energy transfer effects in a way that allows the user to relate these terms from complex nonlinear discrete and continuous time models to the frequency domain and vice versa.

== See also ==
- Duffing equation
- Wave turbulence

== Notes and references ==
=== References ===
- Landau, L. D.; Lifshitz, E. M. (1976), Mechanics (3rd ed.), Pergamon Press, ISBN 0-08-021022-8, (hardcover).and (softcover)
- Rajasekar, S.; Sanjuan, M. A. F. (2016), Nonlinear Resonances (1st ed.), Springer, ISBN 978-3-319-24886-8, (ebook)
