= Zakharov system =

System of differential equations describing Langmuir waves

In mathematics, the Zakharov system is a system of non-linear partial differential equations, introduced by Vladimir Zakharov in 1972 to describe the propagation of Langmuir waves in an ionized plasma. The system consists of a complex field u and a real field n satisfying the equations

$$\begin{align} i \partial_t^{} u + \nabla^2 u &= un\\
\Box n &= -\nabla^2 (|u|^2_{})\end{align}$$

where $\Box$ is the d'Alembert operator.

== See also ==
- Resonant interaction; the Zakharov equation describes non-linear resonant interactions.
