= Waldshut-Tiengen =

- Town
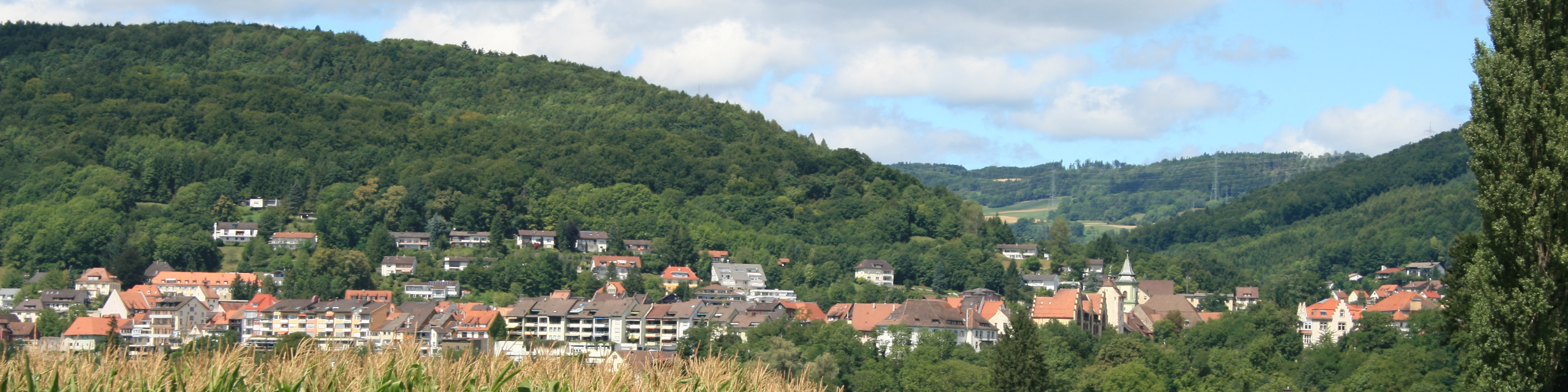

- Coat of arms

- Location of Waldshut-Tiengen within Waldshut district
- Interactive map of Waldshut-Tiengen
- Location within Germany Location within Baden-Württemberg
- Coordinates: 47°37′23″N 08°12′52″E
- Country: Germany
- State: Baden-Württemberg
- Admin. region: Freiburg
- District: Waldshut
- Subdivisions: 2 Kernstädte und 10 Stadtteile

Government
  - Mayor (2023–31): Martin Gruner (Ind.)

Area
  - Total: 77.97 km^{2} (30.10 sq mi)
- Elevation: 341 m (1,119 ft)

Population (2025-12-31)
  - Total: 25,084
  - Density: 321.7/km^{2} (833.2/sq mi)
- Time zone: UTC+01:00 (CET)
  - Summer (DST): UTC+02:00 (CEST)
- Postal codes: 79741–79761
- Dialling codes: 07751, 07741, 07755 (Oberalpfen, Waldkirch)
- Vehicle registration: WT
- Website: www.waldshut-tiengen.de

Waldshut-Tiengen (German pronunciation: [ˈvaltshuːt ˈtiːŋən]; Alemannic: Waldshuet-Düenge), commonly known as Waldshut, is a city in southwestern Baden-Württemberg right at the Swiss border. It is the district seat and at the same time the biggest city in Waldshut district and a "middle centre" in the area of the "high centre" Lörrach/Weil am Rhein to whose middle area most towns and communities in Waldshut district belong (with the exception of seven communities that belong to Bad Säckingen's area). There are furthermore complexities arising from cross-border traffic between this area and the Swiss cantons of Aargau, Schaffhausen and Zürich. This classification relates to Walter Christaller's Central Place Theory, however, and not to any official administrative scheme.

The city, which was newly created in the framework of the 1975 municipal reform, at that time passed the 20,000 mark in population. City council then applied to have the city raised to Große Kreisstadt, which the government of Baden-Württemberg granted on 1 July 1976. Waldshut-Tiengen is also in an "administrative community" (Verwaltungsgemeinschaft) with the communities of Dogern, Lauchringen and Weilheim.

== Geography ==
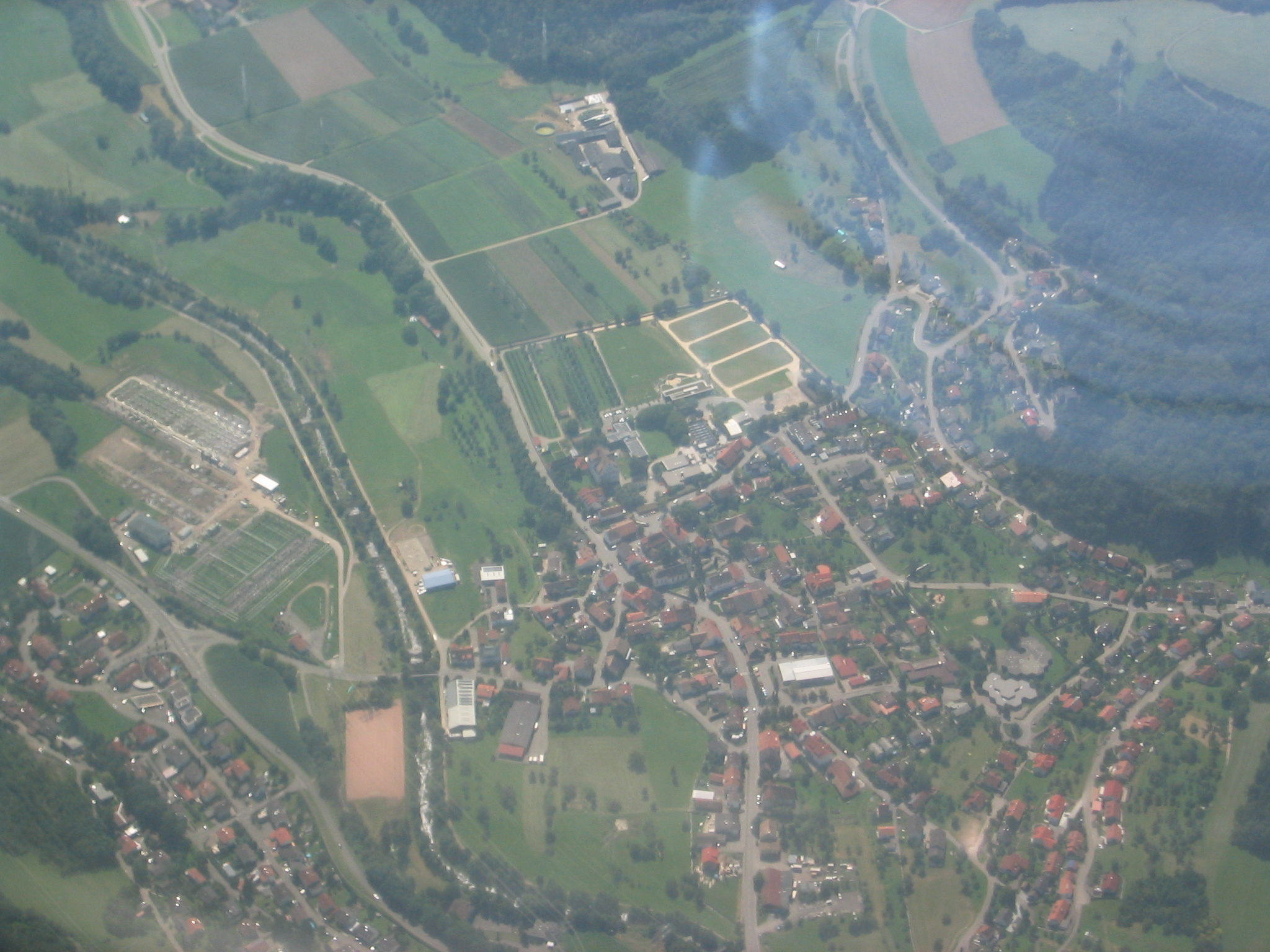
Aerial view of Gurtweil

Waldshut-Tiengen lies at the edge of the southern Black Forest, right on the Rhine river, along which runs the German-Swiss border. The Waldshut townsite lies about 2 km west of where the river Aar empties into the Rhine. Tiengen lies near where the river Wutach meets the Rhine, on the way into the Klettgau, a German-Swiss border region on the Rhine's north bank. Also within the town's municipal area are the rivers Steina and Schlücht, which both empty into the Wutach. From this arose Tiengen's former description as a Viertälerstadt (four-valley town).

=== Neighbouring towns ===
The following towns all border on the town of Waldshut-Tiengen. The list runs clockwise, starting in the west: Dogern, Albbruck, Dachsberg, Weilheim, Ühlingen-Birkendorf, Wutöschingen, Lauchringen and Küssaberg (all in Waldshut district) and furthermore, across the Rhine, Koblenz, Leuggern and Full-Reuenthal (all in the canton of Aargau).

=== Parts of town ===
The town's municipal area consists of the two townsites of Waldshut and Tiengen and the nine communities amalgamated with these two former towns in the municipal reform. These are Aichen (with Gutenburg), Breitenfeld, Detzeln, Eschbach, Gurtweil, Indlekofen, Krenkingen, Oberalpfen and Waldkirch (with Gaiß and Schmitzingen).

For all nine once independent communities as well as for the community of Schmitzingen, which was formerly part of Waldkirch, Ortschaften have been established in the sense in which this term refers to municipal organization in Baden-Württemberg. This means that they each have a community council chosen by the eligible voters at each municipal election, and each one with a chairperson. The Ortschaften bear the same names as these former communities, with a few anomalies (Aichen-Gutenberg for the former Aichen, Gaiß-Waldkirch for the two neighbourhoods in the former Waldkirch, and Schmitzingen, which was formerly part of Waldkirch). The size of these councils is limited to six, but Gurtweil is an exception with ten.

== History ==
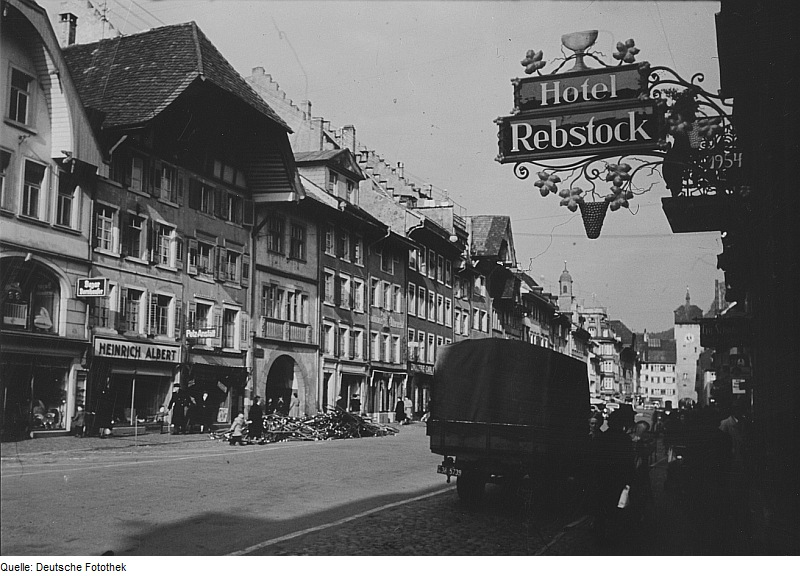
Waldshut in the 1950s

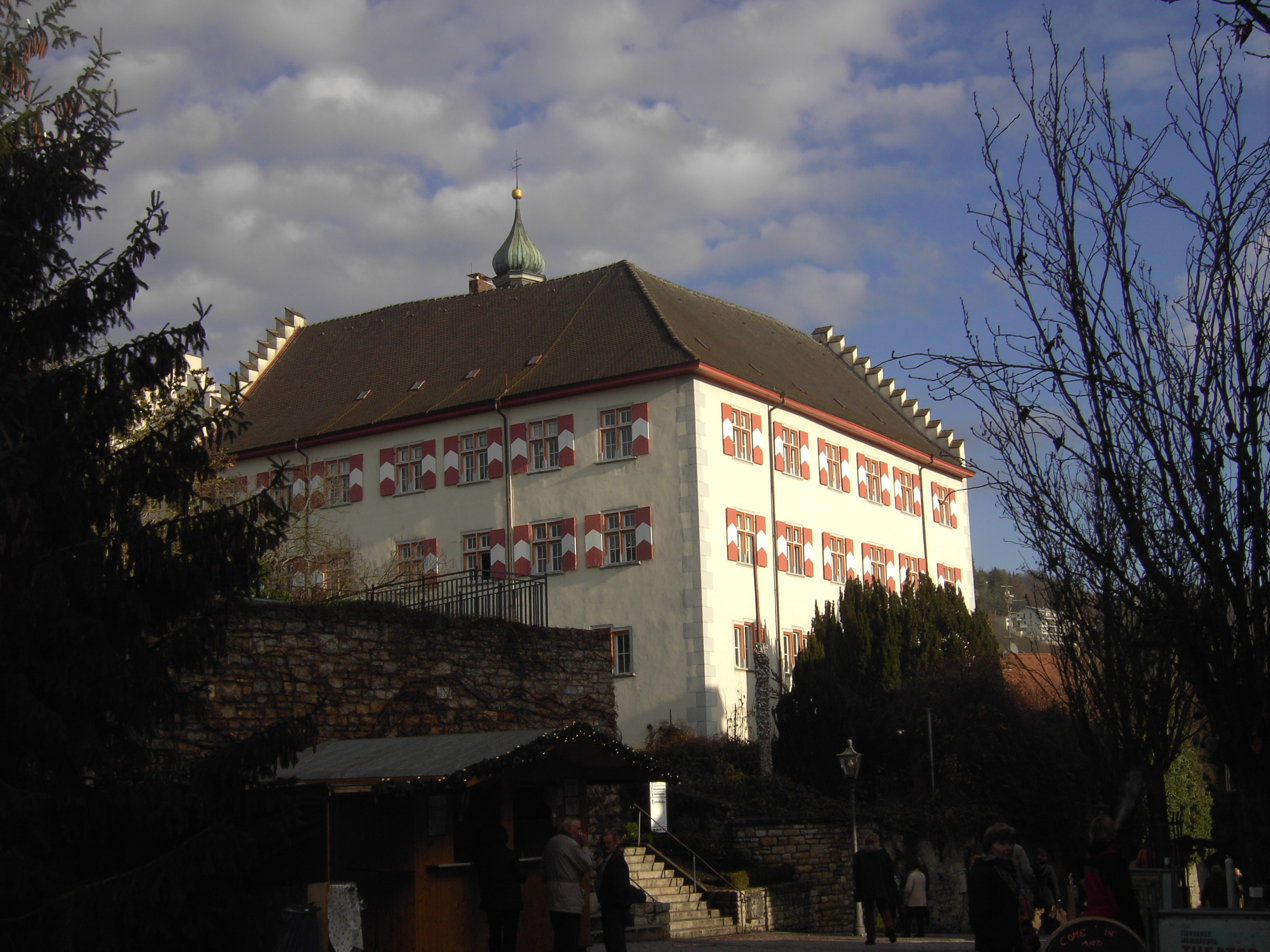
The Castle of Tiengen

Until 1803, Waldshut belonged with the Hotzenwald to Further Austria. Tiengen/Hochrhein (until 2 September 1964 Tiengen (Oberrhein)) was the residence of the Landgraves of Klettgau who belonged in early modern times first to the Counts of Sulz, and after their line died out, to the Fürsten of Schwarzenberg. Gurtweil belonged first to the Abbey of St. Gall, and later to the Rheinau Monastery, but after the Thirty Years' War to Saint Blaise's Benedictine Monastery the St. Blaise Abbey, Black Forest.

In the Waldshut War of 1468 – a localized conflict over hegemony in the south Black Forest region – Tiengen was absorbed by the Old Swiss Confederacy, while the town of Waldshut was besieged and partly destroyed.

In 1805, Waldshut went to Baden and became the seat of an Amt, which over the years was changed many times, and in 1939 was turned into the Kreis (District) of Waldshut. In 1973, the district's area was increased under the municipal reform.

Tiengen likewise went to Baden in 1806 and belonged to the Amt of Klettgau, and in 1812 to the regional Amt of Tiengen, which was abolished in 1819. Thereafter the town belonged to the regional Amt of Waldshut.

=== Amalgamation ===
Waldshut-Tiengen's municipal area developed as follows:

- On 1 January 1971 the communities of Breitenfeld and Detzeln were amalgamated into the town of Tiengen/Hochrhein. They were followed on 1 July 1974 by the communities of Aichen and Krenkingen.
- On 1 July 1971, the communities of Eschbach, Indlekofen, Oberalpfen and Waldkirch (with the communities of Gaiß and Schmitzingen, amalgamated in 1935) were amalgamated into the town of Waldshut.
- On 1 January 1975, both towns, Waldshut and Tiengen/Hochrhein, along with the community of Gurtweil, were amalgamated to form the new town of Waldshut-Tiengen.

=== Population development ===
Population figures are for respective municipal areas at the times to which the figures apply. Until 1974, the figures for the town of Waldshut are given. The figures are either census results (¹) or official extrapolations.

Year	Population figure
1400	≈1,000
1650	≈400
1811	1,111
1834	1,263
1852	1,435
1 December 1871	2,130
1 December 1880 ¹	2,468
1 December 1900 ¹	3,587
1 December 1910 ¹	4,270
16 June 1925 ¹	5,226
16 June 1933 ¹	6,460

Year	Population figure
17 May 1939 ¹	6,554
13 September 1950 ¹	8,255
6 June 1961 ¹	10,883
27 May 1970 ¹	10,669
31 December 1975	22,046
31 December 1980	21,410
27 May 1987 ¹	21,264
31 December 1990	21,913
31 December 1995	22,140
31 December 2000	22,139
31 March 2005	22,578

¹ Census figures

=== Religion ===
Waldshut first belonged to the Bishopric of Konstanz. In 1524, Dr. Balthasar Hubmaier wanted to introduce the Reformation. This, however, could not be achieved. As a result of belonging to Further Austria, Waldshut and its environs remained overwhelmingly Catholic until the 19th century. The town had even been the deaconry seat since the 12th century. The neighbouring town of Tiengen and its environs also remained overwhelmingly Catholic, albeit with a few of Hubmaier's followers who believed in his Anabaptist teachings. As of 1821, the Catholic communities in today's Waldshut-Tiengen belonged to the Archbishopric of Freiburg, and indeed to the two deaconries of Waldshut and Wutachtal. These have been merged into three pastoral units (divisions consisting of several parishes). The pastoral unit of Maria Bronnen includes the parishes of St. Marien Waldkirch, St. Sebastian Aichen and St. Simon und Judas Gurtweil as well as the neighbouring parishes of St. Peter und Paul Weilheim, St. Stephan Weilheim-Nöggenschwiel, St. Pankratius Berau and St. Laurentius Brenden (both in the community of Ühlingen-Birkendorf). The pastoral unit of Waldshut includes the Liebfrauengemeinde and the neighbouring parish of St. Klemens in Dogern. In the Deaconry of Wutachtal, the two parishes of Mariä Himmelfahrt Tiengen and St. Nikolaus Krenkingen together with the neighbouring parish of Herz Jesu Lauchringen-Unterlauchringen belong to the pastoral unit of Tiengen.

In the 19th century, Protestants also came to Waldshut and Tiengen. Waldshut's Protestants were at first under Säckingen's care, but in 1870, Waldshut got its own minister, and in 1890, an affiliated parish was established. In 1921, the community became a full-fledged parish in its own right. To this parish also nowadays belong the Protestants in the communities of Eschbach, Indlekofen and Waldkirch, along with a few other neighbouring communities. A Protestant community also developed in Tiengen in 1871, which at first was affiliated with Kadelburg. The Christuskirche (church) was built in 1905. There has been a full-fledged parish there since 1926. To this Evangelical parish also nowadays belong the Protestants in the communities of Aichen, Breitenfeld, Detzeln, Gurtweil and Krenkingen along with a few other neighbouring communities. The Protestants in the community of Oberalpfen belong to the Hochrhein church region of the Evangelical State Church in Baden.

Alongside the two big churches, there are also communities belonging to free churches, among which are an Evangelical Free Church community (Baptists) with their Balthasar Hubmaier Church, the New Apostolic Church, and the Old Catholic Church.

== Politics ==
Waldshut-Tiengen's municipal council consists of 26 unpaid city councillors whose chairperson is the mayor (Oberbürgermeister). The last municipal election on 13 June 2004 yielded the following division of seats:

Party	Seats
CDU	13
SPD	6
Free Voters (citizens' coalition)	3
Greens	2
FDP	2
Total	26

=== Mayors ===
Previously, a Schultheiß (village head) stood at the lead of the town of Waldshut, including an eight-person council. Both were directly elected. In 1527, the Schultheiß was temporarily appointed by the lords (Landesherren). Besides this, there were also Ratsherren ("Council Lords") ("Inner Council") consisting of four "old" and four "new" advisers. The first was the governor of the Schultheiß's office, and thereby the town's actual mayor. For the towsfolk's representation, there was an "Outer Council" with guild masters. In the 16th century, the Inner Council had a different organization. To this belonged the Schultheiß, the governor of the Schultheiß's office, the town clerk and five advisers. The Outer Council then had six members. By 1789, there was a Bürgermeister instead of a governor of the Schultheiß's office.

In Tiengen there was first a Schultheiß and six advisers, then as of 1422 an elected Schultheiß and the advisers as well as a reeve (Vogt) appointed by the lord. The bylaws were then changed many times. In 1703, the town head bore the title Stadtvogt ("town reeve")

Since the town of Waldshut-Tiengen was raised to Große Kreisstadt in 1976, the town head has borne the official title Oberbürgermeister. The Oberbürgermeister is directly elected by eligible voters for a term of eight years and is head of the municipal council. The second-in-command is the first councillor, who bears the title Bürgermeister.

Bürgermeister of Waldshut

- -1810: Karl Josef Haitz
- 1810-1817: Ignaz Straubhaar
- 1817-1819: Martin Bähr
- 1819-1830: Johann Jakob Soder
- 1830-1834: Anton Bähr
- 1834-1840: Balthasar Merzler
- 1840-1865: Vinzenz Bürgi
- 1865-1878: Gustav Straubhaar
- 1878-1885: Karl Frowin Mayer
- 1885-1894: Alois Lang
- 1894-1910: Leopold Büchele
- 1910-1923: Leopold Kupferschmid
- 1924-1931: Dr. Paul Horster
- 1932-1942: Albert Wild
- 1942-1945: August Birkenmeier
- 1945-1957: Hermann Dietsche
- 1965-1975: Dr. Friedrich Wilhelm Utsch

Bürgermeister of Tiengen

- -1824: Melchior Rutschmann
- 1824-1838: Xaver Kaiser
- 1839-1861: Franz Xaver Rutschmann
- 1861-1873: Ludwig Thoma
- 1873-1879: Franz Joseph Seeger
- 1879-1885: Joseph Bindert
- 1885-1907: Heinrich Maier
- 1907-1917: Karl Pfister
- 1919-1927: Wilhelm Haiß
- 1927-1934: Dr. Josef Frantzen
- 1935-1945: Wilhelm Gutmann, NSDAP
- 1945: Ernst Herion
- 1945-1946: Alois Multerer
- 1946-1948: Alfons Kirchgäßner (1947-48 suspended, affairs taken over by Josef Hürst)
- 1948-1951: Josef Hürst
- 1951-1961: Georg Möllmann
- 1961-1975: Franz Schmidt

Bürgermeister of Waldshut-Tiengen since 1975

- 1975-1994: Franz-Joseph Dresen, Bürgermeister, as of 1976 Oberbürgermeister
- 1994-2015: Martin Albers, Oberbürgermeister
- 2015-today: Philipp Frank, Oberbürgermeister

=== Coat of arms ===
The coat of arms was granted by the Freiburg Government Presidium on 2 November 1981. It is a melding of Waldshut's and Tiengen's two former coats of arms. The man on the left half of the shield, the Waldshuter Männle, had been used as a seal stamp in Waldshut since the 13th century. From his outfit, the man is taken to be a ranger (German: Waldhüter), and is therefore also deemed to be a "canting" coat of arms, being somewhat suggestive of the former town's name. The Madonna and Child on the right side come from Tiengen's old town seal, and are also known to date back quite a long way. They are, however, emblazoned a bit differently compared to the originals.

== Economy and infrastructure ==
=== Industries ===
Other than small-scale machine and furniture manufacturing industries, the town of Waldshut-Tiengen no longer has an industrial establishment worth mentioning. A large part of the working population of the town go to work each day in Switzerland, which is just across the river.

=== Electricity ===
In northern Tiengen there has been since 1930 a large transformer station for 380, 220 and 110 kV run by RWE AG. This is where the western branch of the North-South Transmission Line – the world's oldest – coming from Herbertingen ends.

=== Transport ===
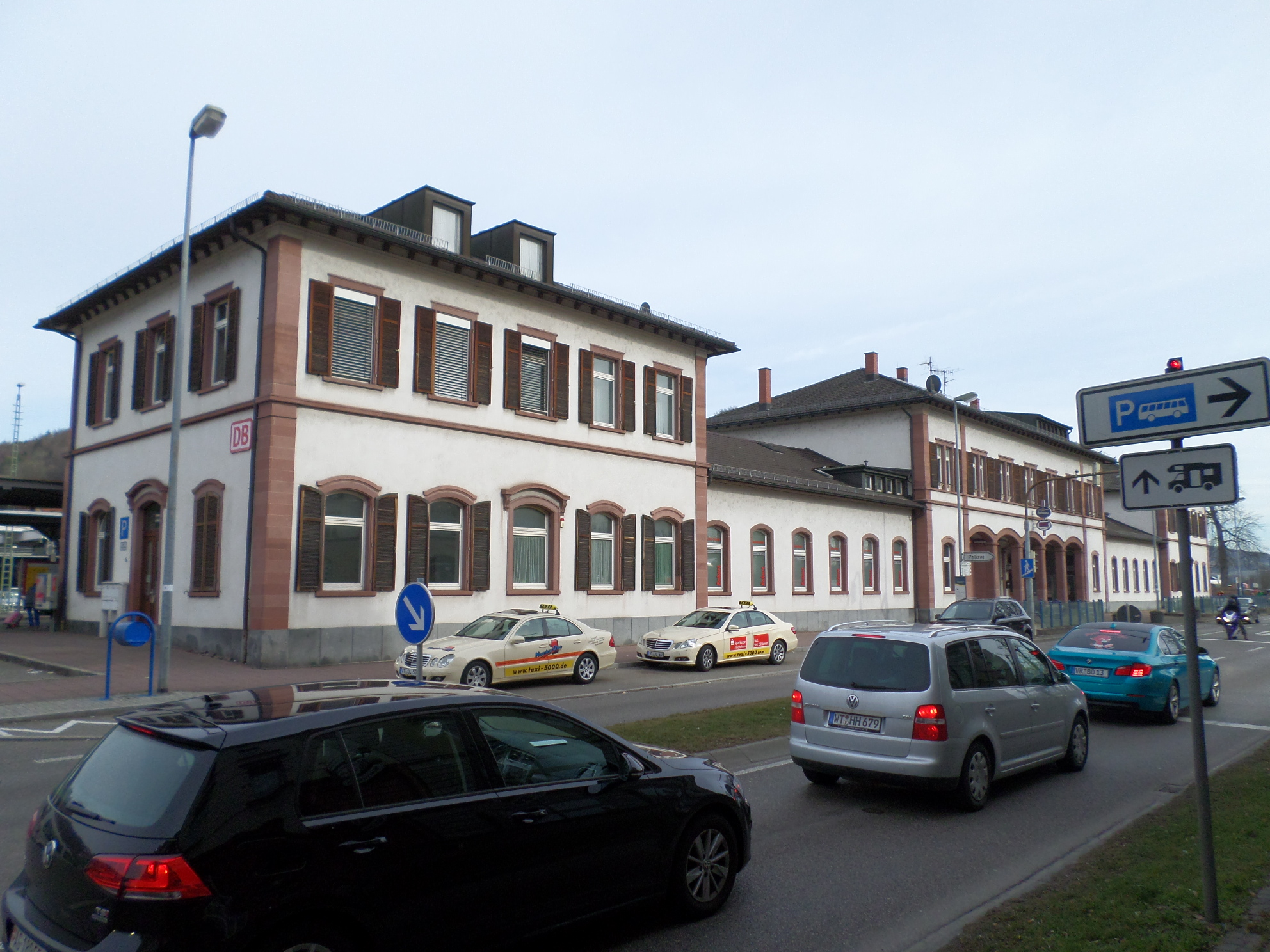
Waldshut Station

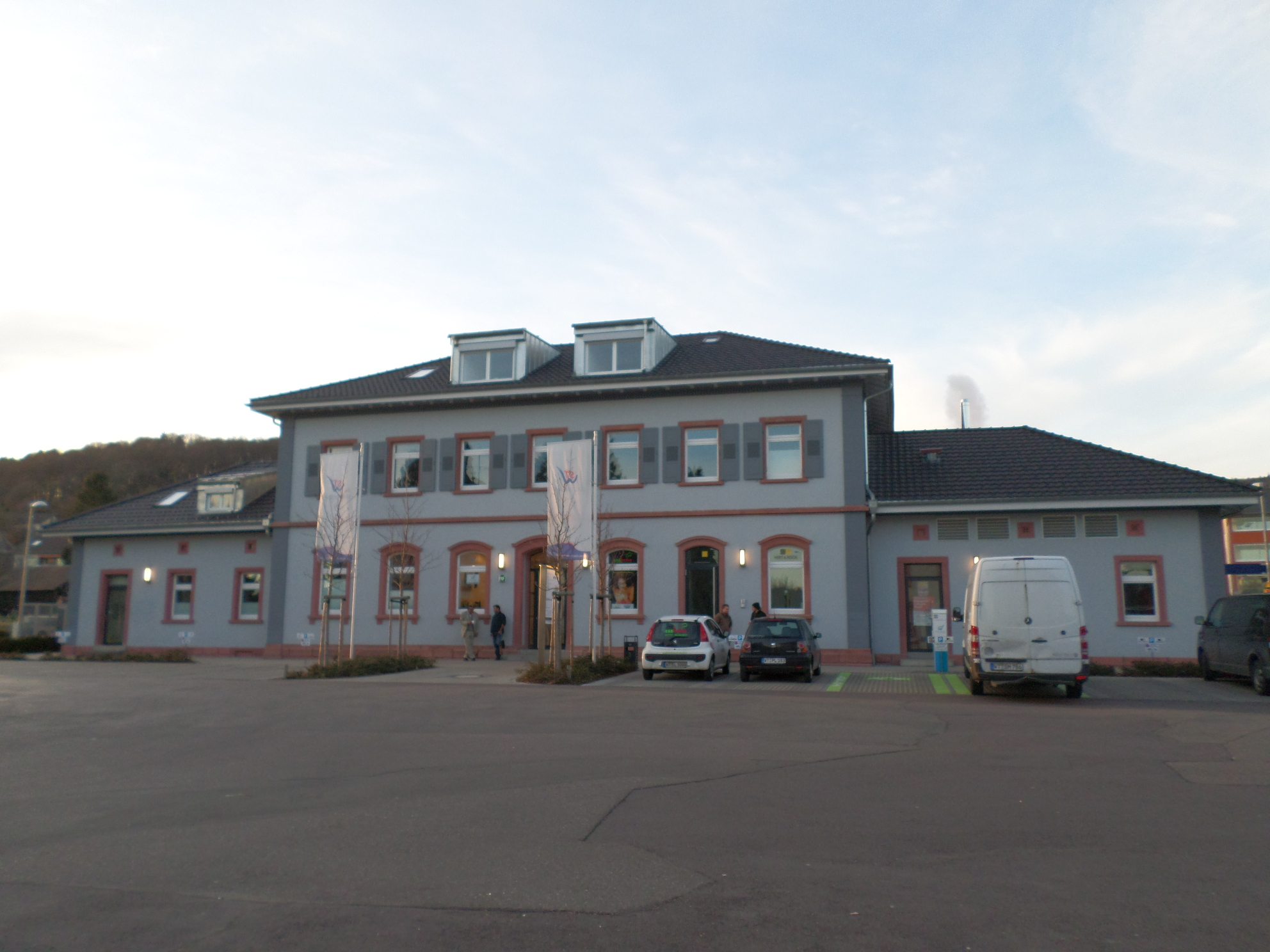
Tiengen Station

The town lies on the High Rhine Railway (Hochrheinbahn), a railway running between Basel and Schaffhausen (both in Switzerland), and Waldshut station serves as an important railway hub.

The railway line across the border to Koblenz, opened in 1859, is the oldest line across the Rhine between Germany and Switzerland. The Wutach Valley Railway, another railway, has its southern terminus in Waldshut-Tiengen. Local public transport is provided by several buslines. The town belongs to the Waldshut Tariff Association.

By road, Waldshut-Tiengen can be reached from either the east or the west on Bundesstraße (Federal Highway) B 34, and from the north on Bundesstraße B 500. A connection with the Swiss road system is afforded by the Rhine bridge to Koblenz.

For local passenger transport, there is a ferry connection across the river to the Swiss community of Full.

The nearest airports are Zurich Airport, located 42 km (26 mi) south east and EuroAirport Basel Mulhouse Freiburg, located 69 km (43 mi) west of Waldshut-Tiengen.

=== Authorities and courts ===
Waldshut-Tiengen is the seat of the Waldshut district's State Council Office. The town has a local court and a state court as well as a notary's office and a financial office. Furthermore, the town is also the seat of the Regional Assembly of Hochrhein-Bodensee, and also seat of the Evangelical State Church in Baden region of Hochrhein and of the Waldshut deaconry within the Hochrhein Region of the Archbishopric of Freiburg.

=== Media ===
The local happenings in Waldshut-Tiengen are reported by the daily newspaper Südkurier, based in Konstanz, and the Alb-Bote, which is likewise part of the Südkurier group. The Südwestrundfunk broadcasting service has a regional office in Waldshut-Tiengen.

=== Educational institutions ===
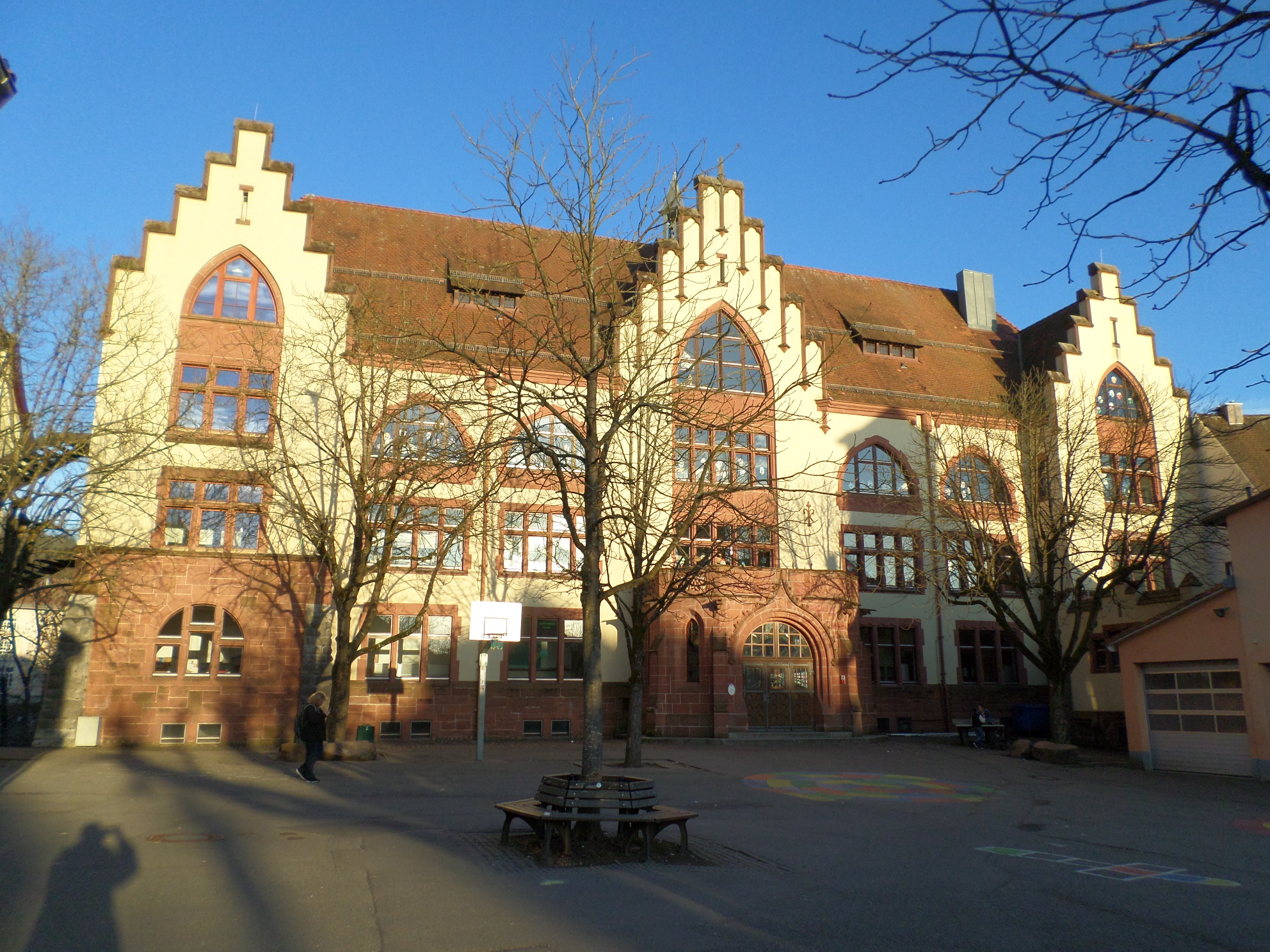
Heinrich Hansjakob School

In Waldshut-Tiengen there are two general-education Gymnasien (Hochrhein-Gymnasium Waldshut and Klettgau-Gymnasium Tiengen), two Realschulen (Robert-Schuman-Realschule Waldshut and Realschule Tiengen), a special school (Waldtor-Schule), another special school with a speech therapy school (Langenstein-Schule), a primary school (Johann-Peter-Hebel-Grundschule Tiengen) and four combined primary school-Hauptschulen (Grund- und Hauptschule Gurtweil, Hans-Thoma-Schule Tiengen, Heinrich-Hansjakob-Grund- und Hauptschule and Theodor-Heuss-Schule). The Waldshut district is home to the Waldshut Vocational School (Gewerbeschule Waldshut, mainly a technical Gymnasium), the Justus-von-Liebig-Schule (mainly a biotechnological and nutritional-science Gymnasium), the Sales School (Kaufmännische Schule, a commercial high school), the Carl-Heinrich-Rösch-Schule for persons with mental disabilities (with kindergarten) and the Wutachschule for persons with physical disabilities (with kindergarten).

The private Hochrhein Educational and Advisory Centre (Hochrhein- Bildungs- und Beratungszentrum, or HBBZ), the private Vocational School for Makeup Artists and Makeup Special Effects (Berufsfachschule für Maskenbildner und Make Up Spezialeffekte), the Hochrhein Christian School (primary), the Technical School for Agriculture (Fachschule für Landwirtschaft) and the School for Child guidance at the Küssaberg Home (Schule für Erziehungshilfe am Heim Küssaberg) fill out the scholastic offerings in Waldshut-Tiengen.

The Justus-von-Liebig-Schule, opened on May 22, 2003, was one of Germany's first schools built to the Passivhaus low-energy building standard.

== Culture and sightseeing ==
=== Buildings ===
==== In Waldshut ====
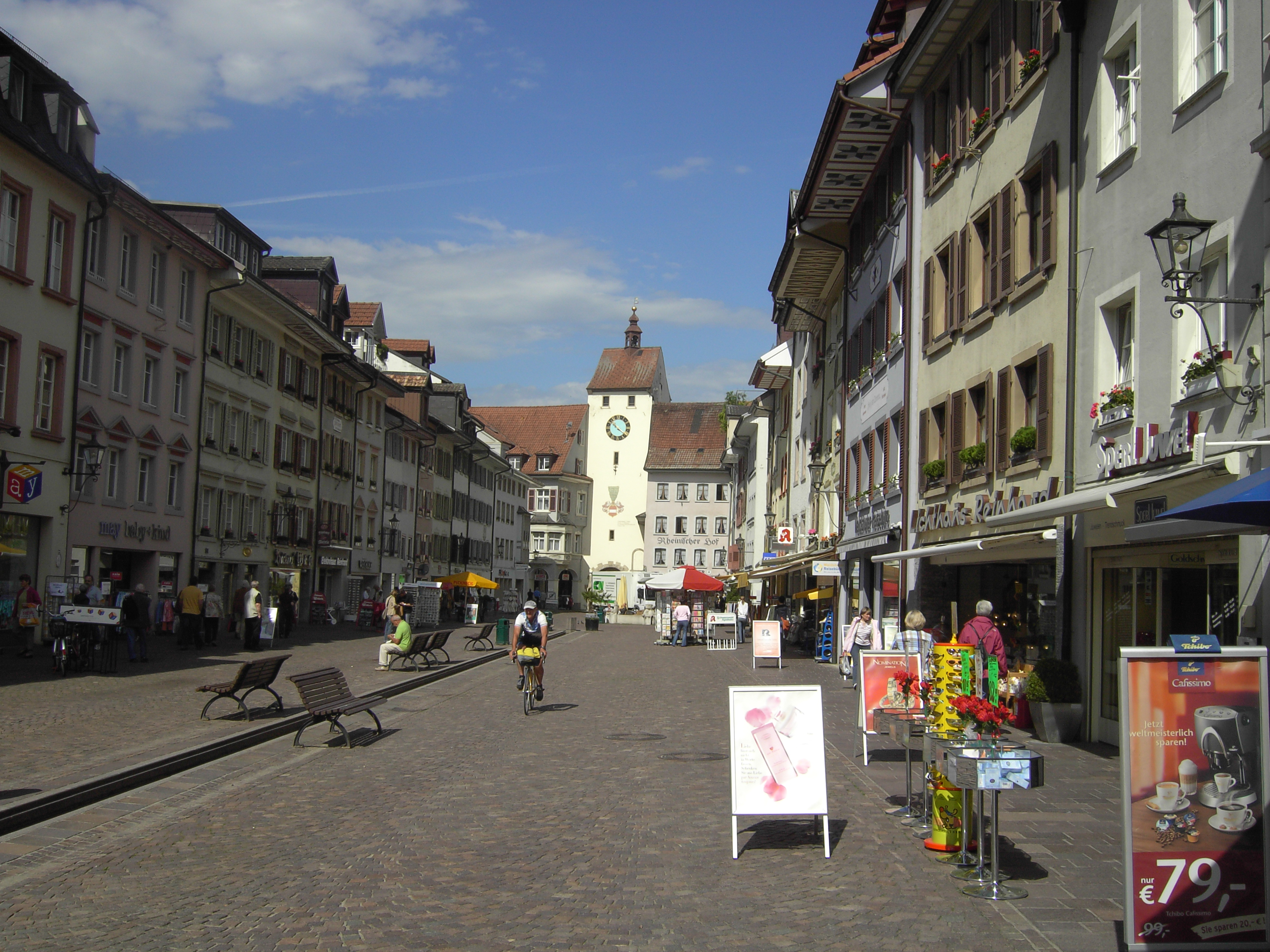
The Kaiserstraße in Waldshut

The Upper Gate (Oberes Tor), also called the Schaffhauser Tor, is the town's landmark. It is the east town gate and was built on foundations laid down in the 13th century. Until 1864, it served as the town gaol.

Kaiserstraße (a pedestrian precinct) is Waldshut's main street. In its middle flows the town brook. Moreover, there are three fountains here with statuary.

Special buildings in Waldshut are the Schultheißschen Haus, the Greiffenegg-Schlössle, the Waldvogtei (forest reeve's house), the Lower Gate (Unteres Tor) or Basler Tor (west town gate), the Roll'sche Haus and the town hall. The Gottesackerkapelle ("God's Acre Chapel") was built in 1683. The Hexenturm ("Witches' Tower") is a round tower of the inner town fortifications, which for a time served as a prison for apostates.

The Catholic town parish Church of Our Lady was built in 1804 in classicist style. The 13th-century Gothic choir was incorporated into it. Next to the church is the 1749 parsonage. The Evangelical Church of Reconciliation (Versöhnungskirche) was only built in 1977.

==== In Tiengen ====
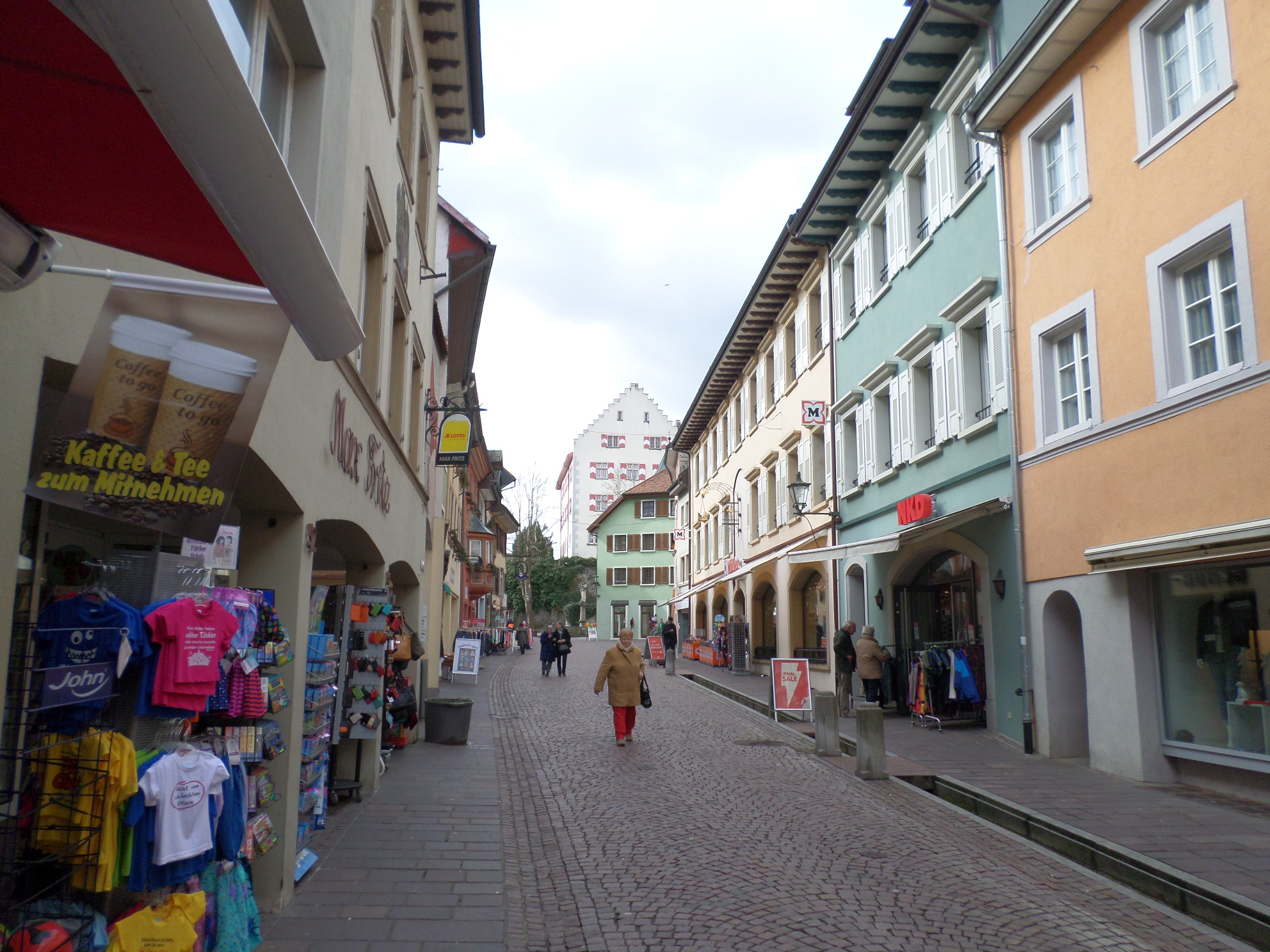
The Hauptstraße in Tiengen

The town's landmark is the Storchenturm, a corner post of the old town fortifications, built about 1300. It once served as a prison, the Diebsturm ("Thief's Tower"). The cap put on top in 1899 once hosted a stork's nest, hence the tower's name.

The old stately home (Schloss) is a former dwelling tower of the old Tiengen Castle. The new stately home was a residential palace of the Landgraves of Sulz and Lords of the Landgraviat Klettgau. The little stately home (kleines Schloss) was rebuilt after the Thirty Years' War.

The town hall was built in the 16th century. The Holy Cross Chapel (Heilig-Kreuz-Kapelle) was mentioned in 1509 as a pilgrimage chapel, but its present form was only built in 1631. The former town reeve's house, built in 1568, is a late Gothic patrician house.

The Cemetery Chapel (Friedhofskapelle) was built in 1691. Furthermore, parts of the old town wall are still maintained. The Catholic town parish Church of St. Mary Ascension (St. Maria Himmelfahrt) was built by Peter Thumb between 1753 and 1755 in the Baroque style. The tower foundation is, however, is Gothic. The Evangelical Church was built in 1905 in neo-Gothic style.

In the amalgamated communities, the following churches can be found:

- Aichen Catholic Church (built 1973)
- Allmut Chapel (built 1886)
- St. Georg Breitenfeld (built 1861)
- St. Oswald Detzeln (16th century)
- St. Pancras's Chapel Eschbach (about 1500)
- St. Konrad Gurtweil (originally built 1612, but rebuilt 1740–1747)
- St. Josephskapelle Indlekofen (built 1877)
- Krenkingen Church (built 1766)
- John the Baptist Chapel (built about 1730)
- Church of St. Mary Ascension (built 1758)
- Michaelskapelle Gaiß (built 1830)
- Josephskapelle Schmitzingen (built 1953)

=== Regular events ===
- June "Hello Neighbour" ("Hallo Nachbar") town festival in Waldshut; street festival Saturday and Sunday on Kaiserstraße with much conversation, music and dance. Last time 2004.
- July "Schwyzertag" in Tiengen with pageant.
- August "Waldshuter Chilbi" with pageant.
- September/Oktober Erntefest Tiengen (harvest festival).

== Notable people ==
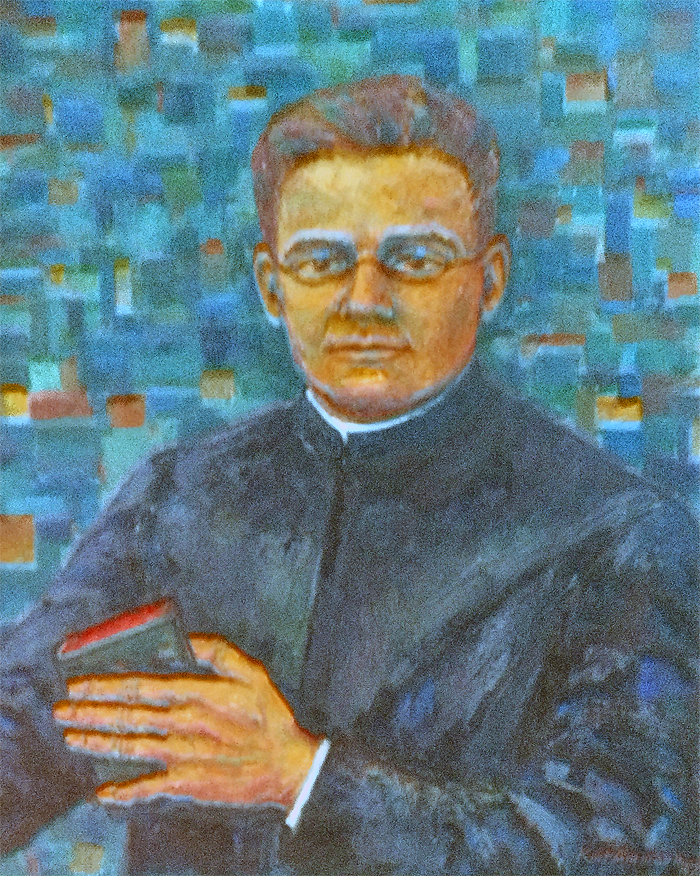
Painting of Francis Mary of the Cross Jordan

- Balthasar Hubmaier (1485–1528), an Anabaptist, local priest from 1521; founded the Waldshut Baptist community.
- Francis Mary of the Cross Jordan (1848–1918), Catholic priest, founded the Salvatorians, beatified 2021.
- Georg Duffing (1861-1944r), engineer worked on vibrations mathematically, invented the Duffing equation.
- Hermann Dietsche, (DE Wiki) (1884-1972) engineer and politician (CDU), mayor and Honorary citizen
- Fridolin von Senger und Etterlin (1891–1963), general in WWII
- Peter Straub (born 1939), politician, (CDU), Landtag president of Baden-Württemberg and President of the EU Committee of the Regions
- Werner Dörflinger (1940-2021), politician
- Berthold Riese, (DE Wiki) (born 1944), German ethnologist and Pre-Columbian archaeologist
- Thomas Dörflinger (born 1965), politician
- Max Mutzke (born 1981), singer, songwriter and TV personality

=== Sport ===
- Johannes Flum (born 1987), former footballer who played 345 games
- Christopher Zanella (born 1989), a Swiss former racing driver.
- Shqipon Bektasi (born 1990), footballer who has played over 320 games
- Nico Denz (born 1994), a German professional racing cyclist

== International relations ==
Waldshut-Tiengen is twinned with:

- Lewes, United Kingdom, since 1974
- Blois, France, since June 30, 1963
