= Shqipon Bektasi =

German professional footballer

Personal information
- Date of birth: 14 September 1990 (age 36)
- Place of birth: Waldshut-Tiengen, West Germany
- Height: 1.77 m (5 ft 10 in)
- Position: Forward

Team information
- Current team: Bahlinger SC
- Number: 18

Youth career
- SV Laufenberg
- –2004: FC Tiengen
- 2004–2009: SC Freiburg

Senior career*
| Years | Team | Apps | (Gls) |
| 2009–2012 | SC Freiburg II | 56 | (14) |
| 2009–2012 | SC Freiburg | 2 | (0) |
| 2011–2012 | → 1. FC Heidenheim (loan) | 10 | (0) |
| 2012–2013 | Wormatia Worms | 25 | (9) |
| 2013–2014 | Waldhof Mannheim | 24 | (4) |
| 2014–2016 | Hessen kassel | 38 | (18) |
| 2016–2017 | Stuttgarter Kickers | 13 | (1) |
| 2017–2019 | TSV Steinbach | 44 | (5) |
| 2019– | Bahlinger SC | 135 | (23) |
- * Club domestic league appearances and goals as of 1 January 2025

Shqipon Bektasi (born 14 September 1990) is a German professional footballer who plays as a forward for German club Bahlinger SC.
