= Georg Duffing =

German engineer and inventor

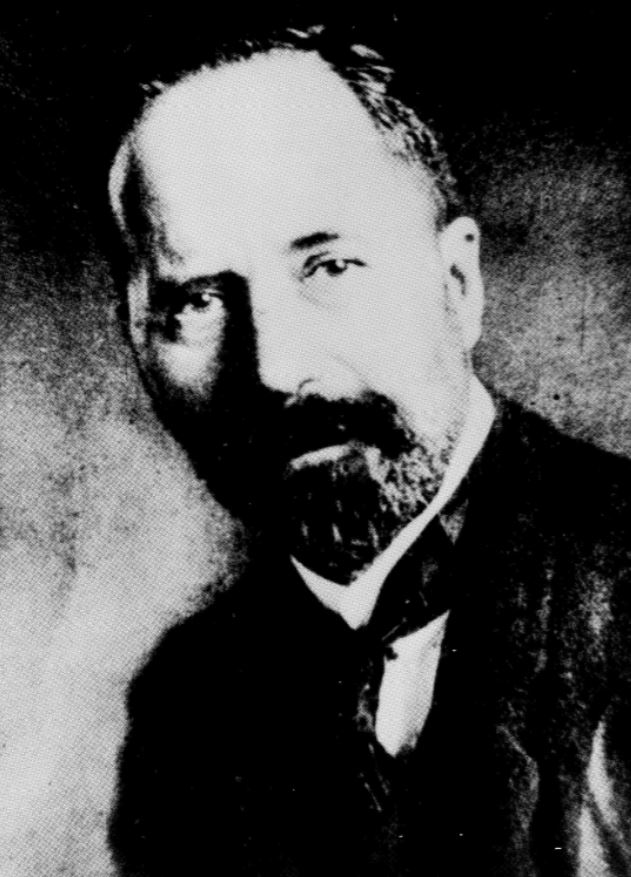
- Born: 11 April 1861; Waldshut, Baden, Germany
- Died: 5 April 1944 (aged 82); Schwedt/Oder, Germany
- Education: Karlsruhe Institute of Technology

Georg Wilhelm Christian Caspar Duffing (April 11, 1861 in Waldshut – April 5, 1944 in Schwedt/Oder) was a German engineer and inventor. In 1918, he described vibrations and their resonances mathematically, as the Duffing equation. Georg Duffing's equation for vibration theory is a standard model for nonlinear vibration. Since the 1970s, it has been popular in chaos theory.

== Family and career ==
Georg Duffing was born in 1861 in the Baden town of Waldshut as the eldest son of merchant Christian Duffing and his wife Julie Spies. In 1862, the family moved to Mannheim, where the father-in-law owned a carpentry business. In high school, Duffing showed a particular talent for mathematics and music. Due to a heart defect, he abandoned his initial intention of pursuing a military career and enrolled from 1878 to 1883 at the Karlsruhe Institute of Technology, successively in mathematics, engineering, and mechanical engineering. Despite his heart defect, he won the Baden gymnastics championships.

After completing his studies, possibly without taking an examination, Duffing joined Cologne-Deutz AG and contributed to the development of a gas engine that was successfully presented in 1905. In 1910, Duffing interned in the US at Westinghouse Electric, a company leading in energy transmission. Returning to Germany, Duffing settled in Berlin in 1913 as an inventor and independent vibration scientist. Duffing attended Max Planck's lectures on quantum physics and conducted research with the support of Eugen Meyer at the Technische Hochschule Berlin-Charlottenburg (now Technische Universität Berlin).

In 1918, he published his widely noticed work on pendulum oscillations, later known as the Duffing oscillator.

In 1921, financially troubled, he joined the Hamburg-based Ölwerke Stern-Sonneborn AG (Ossag), where he dealt with the friction behavior and viscosity of lubricating oils and headed the company's development laboratory. Due to a lubricating oil-related accident of the SS Cap Arcona in 1929, Duffing, who had to fight for his reputation in court due to internal politics in the company, fell into professional ruin.

In 1931, Duffing moved back to Berlin.

Due to air raids on Berlin, he sought refuge in Schwedt, where he died on April 5, 1944. Georg Duffing was buried in Berlin at the Friedhöfe vor dem Halleschen Tor.

Duffing held various technical patents in Germany and the USA.

== Publications ==
- Beitrag zur Bestimmung der Formveränderung gekröpfter Kurbelwellen, Springer, Berlin, 1906. ISBN 978-3-662-39234-8.
- Erzwungene Schwingungen bei veränderlicher Eigenfrequenz, F. Vieweg, Braunschweig, 41/42, 1918.
- Reibungsversuch am Gleitlager, Verein Deutscher Ingenieure -Zeitschrift, 72 (15), 495–499, 1928.
- Elastizität und Reibung beim Riementrieb, Forschung auf dem Gebiete des Ingenieurwesens, 2 (3), 99–104, 1931.
- Messung der Zähigkeit durch gleichförmige koaxiale Bewegung einer Kugel in einem Kreiszylinder, Zeitschrift für Angewandte Mathematik und Mechanik, 13, 366–373, 1933.
- A new form of absolute viscometer, First World Petroleum Congress (London, UK), July 18–24, 1933.
