= Victor L'vov =

Russian-Israeli physicist

Victor S. L'vov
- Виктор Сергеевич Львов
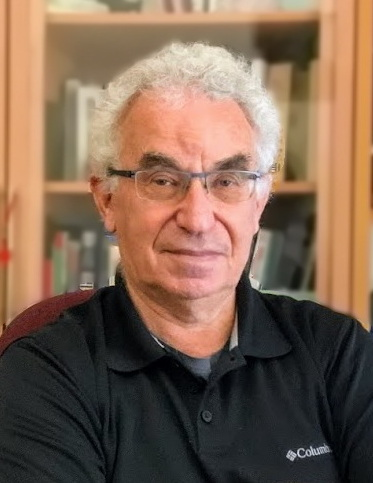
- Citizenship: Israeli
- Occupation: Physicist

Academic background
- Education: M.Sc., Theoretical Physics; Ph.D., Physics and Math; D.Sc., Physics
- Alma mater: University of Leningrad, Russia; Institute for Semiconductors, Leningrad, Russia

Academic work
- Institutions: Weizmann Institute of Science

Victor S. L'vov (Russian: Виктор Сергеевич Львов, Hebrew: ויקטור לבוב) is a Russian-Israeli physicist most known for his contributions to the advanced theories and applications of wave and hydrodynamic turbulence, as well as nonlinear phenomena in various physical systems, including plasma, superfluids, classical environmental flows, and solid states. He has authored about 280 publications in academic journals, including Nature Physics and Physical Review, and has written three books: Nonlinear Spin Waves (in Russian), Kolmogorov Spectra of Turbulence I: Wave Turbulence (in collaboration with V. Zakharov and G. Falkovich), and Wave Turbulence under Parametric Excitation: Applications to Magnets.

== Education ==
L'vov completed his M.Sc. in Theoretical Physics from University of Leningrad in 1966 followed by a Ph.D. in Physics and Math from the Institute for Semiconductors at Leningrad. Later in 1974, he obtained his D.Sc. degree in physics from the Institute of Nuclear Physics at Novosibirsk.

== Career ==
In 1968, L'vov joined the Institute for Semiconductors in Leningrad as a junior research associate, serving until 1970. From 1970 to 1973, he was a senior research associate at the Institute of Nuclear Physics in Novosibirsk. In 1970, he also became an assistant professor in theoretical physics at Novosibirsk University, a position he held until 1974. This was followed by an appointment as an associate professor in theoretical physics. From 1983 to 1990, he served as a professor of computer science at the same institution. Concurrently, from 1973 to 2000, he was the head of the Lab for Nonlinear Physics at the Institution of Automation in Novosibirsk. From 1993 to 2012, he was a professor in the Department of Chemical Physics and has been a professor in the Feinberg Graduate School at the Weizmann Institute of Science since 1997.

== Works ==
L'vov has authored three books. In 1987, he published the book Nonlinear Spin Waves in Russian, which focused on the dynamics and statistics of interacting spin waves. This book included the nonlinear theory of parametric and kinetic excitation of spin waves and provided a comparison of the theory with experiments. His next book, co-authored with V. Zakharov and G. Falkovich in 1992, was Kolmogorov Spectra of Turbulence I: Wave Turbulence. This work provided a study of turbulence across various systems, focusing on wave turbulence, and explored theoretical developments, including Kolmogorov spectra and energy cascade processes. Two years later, he authored Wave turbulence under parametric excitation: applications to magnets. The book explored wave turbulence with a focus on parametric wave turbulence, examining how it developed under strong external periodic modulation and comparing it to fully developed turbulence with different energy scales.

Since 1983, L'vov has co-authored five chapters in various books, including a chapter titled Turbulent Dynamics in Rotating Helium Superfluids in volume 16 of book series Progress in Low Temperature Physics (2009). The chapter investigated turbulence in helium superfluids ³He-B and ⁴He, using new techniques to explore how turbulence initiated, dissipated, and behaved at low temperatures where the normal fluid component was minimal.

== Research ==
As part of his research, L'vov has authored academic papers. His 1975 study reviewed the nonlinear dynamics of spin waves in ferromagnetic dielectrics under parametric excitation, focusing on the limiting mechanism of wave pairing, described by the S theory, and its experimental verification and implications for collective oscillations and self-modulation. While reviewing the magnon properties of yttrium-iron garnet (YIG), his 1993 study introduced a new method for calculating magnon spectra, analyzing temperature-dependent magnetization, and discussing magnon relaxation mechanisms using both experimental data and theoretical models. In 1998, through an article published in Physical Review, he introduced a new "Sabra" shell model of turbulence with improved nonlinear coupling and correlation properties that addressed issues in the GOY model, while preserving multiscaling and exhibiting scaling exponents independent of the viscous mechanism.

Since 2007, L'vov's research has examined superfluid turbulence at near absolute zero. He highlighted how the interaction of quantized vortex filaments caused deviations from classical turbulence models and introduced a bottleneck effect in the energy spectrum at the crossover scale. In 2022, in collaboration with Y. Lvov, S. Nazarenko, and A. Pomyalov, he developed a theory of anisotropic superfluid counterflow turbulence, which explained the discovery of this phenomenon in numerical and laboratory experiments. Back in 2016, he ventured into the field of Bose-Einstein condensation of spin waves (magnons) in room-temperature ferrimagnets, particularly Yttrium-Iron Garnet. Collaborating with an experimental group in Kaiserslautern, he reported the discovery of a supercurrent in a room-temperature Bose–Einstein magnon condensate, Josephson oscillations, propagating Bogolyubov waves, and other quantum mechanical effects. In 2024, he conducted a study investigating how localized heating in magnetic films affected magnetization and the demagnetizing field, leading to changes in magnon dispersion and the formation of magnon supercurrents and Bose-Einstein condensation.

Returning to the study of wave turbulence in 2020, L'vov explored weak wave turbulence in Schrödinger-Helmholtz equations. He highlighted simultaneous inverse and forward cascades and interpreted the inverse cascade as non equilibrium condensation. Furthermore, in 2022, he collaborated with the Nazarenko group, and developed a theory of two-dimensional acoustic turbulence.

== Bibliography ==
=== Books ===
- Нелинейные спиновые волны [Nonlinear Spin Waves] (in Russian). 1987. OCLC 21747508.
- Zakharov, Vladimir E.; L’vov, Victor S.; Falkovich, Gregory (1992). Kolmogorov Spectra of Turbulence I. Springer Series in Nonlinear Dynamics. doi:10.1007/978-3-642-50052-7. ISBN 978-3-642-50054-1.
- L’vov, Victor S. (1994). Wave Turbulence Under Parametric Excitation. Springer Series in Nonlinear Dynamics. doi:10.1007/978-3-642-75295-7. ISBN 978-3-642-75297-1.

=== Selected articles ===
- Zakharov, V E; L'vov, V S; Starobinets, S S (30 June 1975). "Spin-wave turbulence beyond the parametric excitation threshold". Soviet Physics Uspekhi. 17 (6): 896–919. doi:10.1070/PU1975v017n06ABEH004404.
- Cherepanov, Vladimir; Kolokolov, Igor; L'vov, Victor (July 1993). "The saga of YIG: Spectra, thermodynamics, interaction and relaxation of magnons in a complex magnet". Physics Reports. 229 (3): 81–144. Bibcode:1993PhR...229...81C. doi:10.1016/0370-1573(93)90107-O.
- L’vov, Victor S.; Podivilov, Evgenii; Pomyalov, Anna; Procaccia, Itamar; Vandembroucq, Damien (August 1998). "Improved shell model of turbulence". Physical Review E. 58 (2): 1811–1822. arXiv:chao-dyn/9803025. Bibcode:1998PhRvE..58.1811L. doi:10.1103/PhysRevE.58.1811.
- L’vov, Victor S.; Nazarenko, Sergei V.; Rudenko, Oleksii (26 July 2007). "Bottleneck crossover between classical and quantum superfluid turbulence". Physical Review B. 76 (2) 024520. arXiv:nlin/0612018. Bibcode:2007PhRvB..76b4520L. doi:10.1103/PhysRevB.76.024520.
- Bozhko, Dmytro A.; Serga, Alexander A.; Clausen, Peter; Vasyuchka, Vitaliy I.; Heussner, Frank; Melkov, Gennadii A.; Pomyalov, Anna; L’vov, Victor S.; Hillebrands, Burkard (November 2016). "Supercurrent in a room-temperature Bose–Einstein magnon condensate". Nature Physics. 12 (11): 1057–1062. arXiv:1503.00482. Bibcode:2016NatPh..12.1057B. doi:10.1038/nphys3838.
- Ludwig, Danial; Yakovenko, Victor M. (2022). "Physics-inspired analysis of the two-class income distribution in the USA in 1983–2018". Philosophical Transactions of the Royal Society A: Mathematical, Physical and Engineering Sciences. 380 (2224) 20210162. arXiv:2110.03140. Bibcode:2022RSPTA.38010162L. doi:10.1098/rsta.2021.0162. PMID 35400179.
