= Three-wave equation =

In nonlinear systems, the three-wave equations, sometimes called the three-wave resonant interaction equations or triad resonances, describe small-amplitude waves in a variety of nonlinear media, including water waves in shallow water, capillary waves, the coupling of acoustic waves in the littoral zone, acoustic waves in plasma, oscillations in electrical circuits and in non-linear optics. They are a set of three completely integrable nonlinear partial differential equations.

The three-wave equations represent a fundamental deterministic model underlying wave turbulence theory and serve as a paradigmatic example of resonant interactions in dispersive media. They arise when three waves with wave vectors $\vec{k}_1$, $\vec{k}_2$, and $\vec{k}_3$ satisfy both the resonance condition (commonly expressed as $\vec{k}_1=\vec{k}_2+\vec{k}_3$) and the frequency matching condition $\omega_1=\omega_2+\omega_3$, where $\omega_i$ denotes the angular frequency of each wave component. These resonant triad interactions enable efficient energy transfer between the three wave modes.

Because they provide a direct and tractable example of resonant wave interactions, have broad applicability across the physical sciences, and possess the remarkable property of complete integrability, the three-wave equations have been extensively studied since the 1970s. Their integrability allows for exact analytical solutions via methods such as the inverse scattering transform, making them a cornerstone in the mathematical theory of integrable systems and in the study of soliton-like phenomena. The equations have also played a crucial role in the development of Hamiltonian formulations of wave dynamics and in advancing the understanding of energy cascades in weakly nonlinear wave systems.

== Informal introduction ==
The three-wave equation arises by consideration of some of the simplest imaginable non-linear systems. Linear differential systems have the generic form

$$D\psi=\lambda\psi$$

for some differential operator $D$. The simplest non-linear extension of this is to write

$$D\psi-\lambda\psi=\varepsilon\psi^2.$$

How can one solve this? Several approaches are available. In a few exceptional cases, there might be known exact solutions to equations of this form. In general, these are found in some ad hoc fashion after applying some ansatz. A second approach is to assume that $\varepsilon\ll 1$ and use perturbation theory to find "corrections" to the linearized theory. A third approach is to apply techniques from scattering matrix (S-matrix) theory.

In the S-matrix approach, one considers particles or plane waves coming in from infinity, interacting, and then moving out to infinity. Counting from zero, the zero-particle case corresponds to the vacuum, consisting entirely of the background. The one-particle case is a wave that comes in from the distant past and then disappears into thin air; this can happen when the background is absorbing, deadening or dissipative. Alternately, a wave appears out of thin air and moves away. This occurs when the background is unstable and generates waves: one says that the system "radiates". The two-particle case consists of a particle coming in, and then going out. This is appropriate when the background is non-uniform: for example, an acoustic plane wave comes in, scatters from an enemy submarine, and then moves out to infinity; by careful analysis of the outgoing wave, characteristics of the spatial inhomogeneity can be deduced. There are two more possibilities: pair creation and pair annihilation. In this case, a pair of waves is created "out of thin air" (by interacting with some background), or disappear into thin air.

Next on this count is the three-particle interaction. It is unique, in that it does not require any interacting background or vacuum, nor is it "boring" in the sense of a non-interacting plane-wave in a homogeneous background. Writing $\psi_1, \psi_2, \psi_3$ for these three waves moving from/to infinity, this simplest quadratic interaction takes the form of

$$(D-\lambda)\psi_1=\varepsilon\psi_2\psi_3$$

and cyclic permutations thereof. This generic form can be called the three-wave equation; a specific form is presented below. A key point is that all quadratic resonant interactions can be written in this form (given appropriate assumptions). For time-varying systems where $\lambda$ can be interpreted as energy, one may write

$$(D-i\partial/\partial t)\psi_1=\varepsilon\psi_2\psi_3$$

for a time-dependent version.

== Review ==
Formally, the three-wave equation is

$$\frac{\partial B_j}{\partial t} + v_j \cdot \nabla B_j=\eta_j B^*_\ell B^*_m$$

where $j,\ell,m=1,2,3$ cyclic, $v_j$ is the group velocity for the wave having $\vec k_j, \omega_j$ as the wave-vector and angular frequency, and $\nabla$ the gradient, taken in flat Euclidean space in n dimensions. The $\eta_j$ are the interaction coefficients; by rescaling the wave, they can be taken $\eta_j=\pm 1$. By cyclic permutation, there are four classes of solutions. Writing $\eta=\eta_1\eta_2\eta_3$ one has $\eta=\pm 1$. The $\eta=-1$ are all equivalent under permutation. In 1+1 dimensions, there are three distinct $\eta=+1$ solutions: the $+++$ solutions, termed explosive; the $--+$ cases, termed stimulated backscatter, and the $-+-$ case, termed soliton exchange. These correspond to very distinct physical processes. One interesting solution is termed the simulton, it consists of three comoving solitons, moving at a velocity v that differs from any of the three group velocities $v_1, v_2, v_3$. This solution has a possible relationship to the "three sisters" observed in rogue waves, even though deep water does not have a three-wave resonant interaction.

The lecture notes by Harvey Segur provide an introduction.

The equations have a Lax pair, and are thus completely integrable. The Lax pair is a 3x3 matrix pair, to which the inverse scattering method can be applied, using techniques by Fokas. The class of spatially uniform solutions are known, these are given by Weierstrass elliptic ℘-function. The resonant interaction relations are in this case called the Manley–Rowe relations; the invariants that they describe are easily related to the modular invariants $g_2$ and $g_3.$ That these appear is perhaps not entirely surprising, as there is a simple intuitive argument. Subtracting one wave-vector from the other two, one is left with two vectors that generate a period lattice. All possible relative positions of two vectors are given by Klein's j-invariant, thus one should expect solutions to be characterized by this.

A variety of exact solutions for various boundary conditions are known. A "nearly general solution" to the full non-linear PDE for the three-wave equation has recently been given. It is expressed in terms of five functions that can be freely chosen, and a Laurent series for the sixth parameter.

== Applications ==
Some selected applications of the three-wave equations include:

- In non-linear optics, tunable lasers covering a broad frequency spectrum can be created by parametric three-wave mixing in quadratic ($\chi^{(2)}$) nonlinear crystals.
- Surface acoustic waves and in electronic parametric amplifiers.
- Deep water waves do not in themselves have a three-wave interaction; however, this is evaded in multiple scenarios:
  - Deep-water capillary waves are described by the three-wave equation.
  - Acoustic waves couple to deep-water waves in a three-wave interaction,
  - Vorticity waves couple in a triad.
  - A uniform current (necessarily spatially inhomogenous by depth) has triad interactions.

These cases are all naturally described by the three-wave equation.

- In plasma physics, the three-wave equation describes coupling in plasmas.
