= Manley–Rowe relations =

Formulas to determine the energy balance of a nonlinear wave

The Manley–Rowe relations are mathematical expressions developed originally for electrical engineers to predict the amount of energy in a wave that has multiple frequencies. They have since been found to describe systems in non-linear optics, fluid mechanics and the theory of non-linear dynamical systems, as they provide a pair of invariants or conserved quantities for the three-wave equation. For example, in a resonant interaction in non-linear optics, the Manley–Rowe relations can be interpreted as saying one photon is created as two more are destroyed (or conversely, two are created when one is destroyed.) For the three-wave equation, the Manley–Rowe invariants can be related to the modular invariants $g_2$ and $g_3$ of the Weierstrass ℘-function. This essentially follows because the three-wave interaction has exact solutions that are given by elliptic functions.

== History ==
The original papers, written by two researchers at Bell Labs, J. M. Manley and H. E. Rowe between 1956 and 1960 was for an electrical circuit containing nonlinear capacitors and inductors. One or more oscillators, operating at specified frequencies, are connected to the input of this circuit. The Manley–Rowe relations predict the energy present in waves at various frequencies, including new frequencies (such as harmonics and sidebands) that arise in the circuit due to nonlinearity. The theory is based partly on the principle of conservation of energy. It requires that energy storage in the circuit is a stationary process that varies with time only due to the oscillations and not due to some steady increase or decrease with time. More precisely, the theory describes a resonant interaction between waves at various different frequencies; the resonant interaction describes which frequencies can mix and interact, and the strengths by which they couple.

Because the Manley–Rowe relations are based on general concepts like nonlinear waves and conservation of energy, their use is not limited to the original application in radio-frequency electrical circuits. They have also found use in other scientific fields, for example nonlinear optics. In the electrical circuit for the original derivation of Manley–Rowe relations, capacitors and inductors store energy from a wave and then release it. Other physical systems that involve energy storage for waves, and nonlinear generation of new waves, can make use of the same relations.

John Manley and Harrison Rowe were protégés of Ralph Hartley at Bell Laboratories. The work with nonlinear reactances (inductors and capacitors) was started back in 1917 by John Burton and Eugene Peterson. When Hartley joined Bell Laboratories after being part of Western Electric, he started a research group on nonlinear oscillations. This group was later joined by Peterson, Manley, and Rowe.
