= Elastic pendulum =

Concept in physics and mathematics

Motion of an elastic pendulum - you can see the effect of overlapping vibrations of different frequencies (a composite of the vibrations of a simple pendulum and a spring pendulum)

In physics and mathematics, in the area of dynamical systems, an elastic pendulum (also called spring pendulum or swinging spring) is a physical system where a piece of mass is connected to a spring so that the resulting motion contains elements of both a simple pendulum and a one-dimensional spring-mass system. For specific energy values, the system demonstrates all the hallmarks of chaotic behavior and is sensitive to initial conditions. At very low and very high energy, there also appears to be regular motion. The motion of an elastic pendulum is governed by a set of coupled ordinary differential equations. This behavior suggests a complex interplay between energy states and system dynamics.

== Analysis and interpretation ==
2 DOF elastic pendulum with polar coordinate plots.

The system is much more complex than a simple pendulum, as the properties of the spring add an extra dimension of freedom to the system. For example, when the spring compresses, the shorter radius causes the spring to move faster. It is also possible that the spring has a range that is overtaken by the motion of the pendulum, making it practically neutral to the motion of the pendulum.

=== Lagrangian ===
The spring has the rest length $\ell_0$ and can be stretched by a length $x$. The angle of oscillation of the pendulum is $\theta$.

The Lagrangian $L$ is:
$$L = T - V$$
where $T$ is the kinetic energy and $V$ is the potential energy.

Hooke's law is the potential energy of the spring itself:
$$V_k=\frac{1}{2}kx^2$$
where $k$ is the spring constant.

The potential energy from gravity, on the other hand, is determined by the height of the mass. For a given angle and displacement, the potential energy is:
$$V_g=-gm(\ell_0+x)\cos \theta$$
where $g$ is the gravitational acceleration.

The kinetic energy is given by:
$$T=\frac{1}{2}mv^2$$
where $v$ is the velocity of the mass. To relate $v$ to the other variables, the velocity is written as a combination of a movement along and perpendicular to the spring:
$$T = \frac{1}{2} m \left(\dot x^2 + \left(\ell_0+x\right)^2 \dot \theta^2\right)$$

So the Lagrangian becomes:
$$L = T -V_k - V_g$$
$$L[x,\dot x,\theta, \dot \theta] = \frac{1}{2}m \left(\dot x^2 + \left(\ell_0+x\right)^2 \dot \theta^2\right) -\frac{1}{2}kx^2 + gm \left(\ell_0+x\right)\cos \theta$$

=== Equations of motion ===
With two degrees of freedom, for $x$ and $\theta$, the equations of motion can be found using two Euler–Lagrange equations:
$$\begin{align}
\frac{\partial L}{\partial x} - \frac{d}{dt} \frac{\partial L}{\partial \dot x} &= 0 \\[1ex]
\frac{\partial L}{\partial \theta} - \frac{d}{dt} \frac{\partial L}{\partial \dot \theta} &=0
\end{align}$$

For $x$:
$$m\left(\ell_0+x\right) \dot \theta^2 -kx + gm\cos \theta-m \ddot x=0$$
$\ddot x$ isolated:
$$\ddot x =(\ell_0+x)\dot \theta^2 -\frac{k}{m}x + g\cos \theta$$

And for $\theta$:
$$-gm \left(\ell_0+x\right) \sin \theta - m \left(\ell_0+x\right)^2 \ddot \theta - 2m \left(\ell_0+x\right) \dot x \dot \theta=0$$
$\ddot \theta$ isolated:
$$\ddot \theta=-\frac{g}{\ell_0+x}\sin \theta-\frac{2\dot x}{\ell_0+x}\dot \theta$$

These can be further simplified by scaling length $s = {x}/{\ell_0}$ and time $\tau = t\sqrt{{g}/{\ell_0}}$. Expressing the system in terms of $s$ and $\tau$ results in nondimensional equations of motion. The one remaining dimensionless parameter $\Omega^2 = \frac{k\ell_0}{mg}$ characterizes the system.
$$\frac{d^2 s}{d\tau^2} = \left(s + 1\right) \left(\frac{d\theta}{d\tau}\right)^2 - \Omega^2 s + \cos\theta$$
$$\frac{d^2\theta}{d\tau^2} = -\frac{\sin\theta}{s+1} - \frac{2}{1+s} \frac{ds}{d\tau} \frac{d\theta}{d\tau}$$

The elastic pendulum is now described with two coupled ordinary differential equations. These can be solved numerically. Furthermore, one can use analytical methods to study the intriguing phenomenon of order-chaos-order in this system for various values of the parameter $\Omega^2$ and initial conditions $s$ and $\theta$.

There is also a second example : Double Elastic Pendulum . See

== See also ==
- Double pendulum
- Duffing oscillator
- Pendulum (mathematics)
- Spring-mass system
