= Wave turbulence =

Set of nonlinear waves deviated far from thermal equilibrium

In continuum mechanics, wave turbulence is a set of nonlinear waves deviated far from thermal equilibrium. Such a state is usually accompanied by dissipation. It is either decaying turbulence or requires an external source of energy to sustain it. Examples are waves on a fluid surface excited by winds or ships, and waves in plasma excited by electromagnetic waves etc.

== Appearance ==
External sources by some resonant mechanism usually excite waves with frequencies and wavelengths in some narrow interval. For example, shaking a container with frequency ω excites surface waves with frequency ω/2 (parametric resonance, discovered by Michael Faraday). When wave amplitudes are small – which usually means that the wave is far from breaking – only those waves exist that are directly excited by an external source.

When, however, wave amplitudes are not very small (for surface waves: when the fluid surface is inclined by more than few degrees) waves with different frequencies start to interact. That leads to an excitation of waves with frequencies and wavelengths in wide intervals, not necessarily in resonance with an external source. In experiments with high shaking amplitudes one initially observes waves that are in resonance with one another. Thereafter, both longer and shorter waves appear as a result of wave interaction. The appearance of shorter waves is referred to as a direct cascade while longer waves are part of an inverse cascade of wave turbulence.

== Statistical wave turbulence and discrete wave turbulence ==
Two generic types of wave turbulence should be distinguished: statistical wave turbulence (SWT) and discrete wave turbulence (DWT).

In SWT theory exact and quasi-resonances are omitted, which allows using some statistical assumptions and describing the wave system by kinetic equations and their stationary solutions – the approach developed by Vladimir E. Zakharov. These solutions are called Kolmogorov–Zakharov (KZ) energy spectra and have the form k^{−α}, with k the wavenumber and α a positive constant depending on the specific wave system. The form of KZ-spectra does not depend on the details of initial energy distribution over the wave field or on the initial magnitude of the complete energy in a wave turbulent system. Only the fact the energy is conserved at some inertial interval is important.

The subject of DWT, first introduced in Kartashova (2006), are exact and quasi-resonances. Previous to the two-layer model of wave turbulence, the standard counterpart of SWT were low-dimensioned systems characterized by a small number of modes included. However, DWT is characterized by resonance clustering, and not by the number of modes in particular resonance clusters – which can be fairly big. As a result, while SWT is completely described by statistical methods, in DWT both integrable and chaotic dynamics are accounted for. A graphical representation of a resonant cluster of wave components is given by the corresponding NR-diagram (nonlinear resonance diagram).

In some wave turbulent systems both discrete and statistical layers of turbulence are observed simultaneously, this wave turbulent regime have been described in Zakharov et al. (2005) and is called mesoscopic. Accordingly, three wave turbulent regimes can be singled out—kinetic, discrete and mesoscopic described by KZ-spectra, resonance clustering and their coexistence correspondingly. Energetic behavior of kinetic wave turbulent regime is usually described by Feynman-type diagrams (i.e. Wyld's diagrams), while NR-diagrams are suitable for representing finite resonance clusters in discrete regime and energy cascades in mesoscopic regimes.
