= Vladimir E. Zakharov =

Russian mathematician, physicist and poet (1939–2023)

Vladimir Zakharov
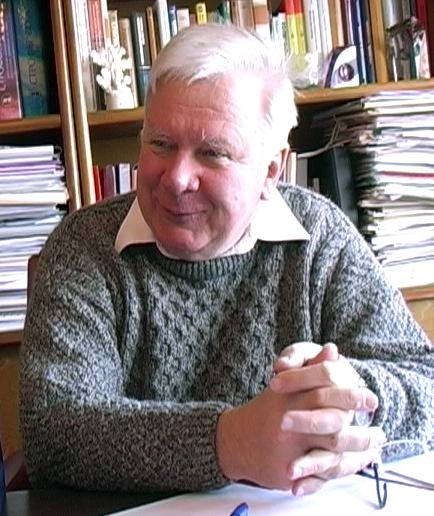
- In his office, 2003
- Born: 1 August 1939; Kazan, Tatar ASSR, Russian SFSR, USSR
- Died: 20 August 2023 (aged 84)
- Education: Novosibirsk State University
- Known for: Theoretical physics
- Awards: Dirac Prize (2003)
- Scientific career
- Fields: Physics
- Workplaces: Landau Institute for Theoretical Physics; University of Arizona; Lebedev Physical Institute
- Doctoral advisor: Roald Sagdeev

Vladimir Evgen'evich Zakharov (Russian: Влади́мир Евге́ньевич Заха́ров; 1 August 1939 – 20 August 2023) was a Soviet and Russian mathematician and physicist. He was Regents' Professor of mathematics at The University of Arizona, director of the Mathematical Physics Sector at the Lebedev Physical Institute, and was on the committee of the Stefanos Pnevmatikos International Award. His research interests covered physical aspects of nonlinear wave theory in plasmas, hydrodynamics, oceanology, geophysics, solid state physics, optics, and general relativity.

Zakharov was awarded the Dirac Medal in 2003 for his contributions to the theory of turbulence, with regard to the exact results and the prediction of inverse cascades, and for "putting the theory of wave turbulence on a firm mathematical ground by finding turbulence spectra as exact solutions and solving the stability problem, and in introducing the notion of inverse and dual cascades in wave turbulence".

Vladimir Zakharov was also a poet. He published several books of poetry in Russia and his works regularly appeared in periodicals, such as Novy Mir, in the 1990s and 2000s. A collection of his poetry in an English translation The Paradise for Clouds was published in the UK in 2009.

== Personal life and education ==
Vladimir Zakharov was born in Kazan, to Evgeniy and Elena Zakharov, an engineer and a schoolteacher. He studied at the Moscow Power Engineering Institute and at the Novosibirsk State University, where he received his specialist degree in physics in 1963 and his Candidate of Sciences degree in 1966, studying under Roald Sagdeev.

Zakharov was married and had three sons. He died in August 2023, at the age of 84.

== Academic career ==
After completing his Candidate of Science degree, Zakharov worked as a researcher at the Budker Institute of Nuclear Physics in Novosibirsk, where in 1971 he completed his Doctor of Sciences degree. In 1974, Zakharov moved to the Landau Institute for Theoretical Physics in Chernogolovka, where he eventually became director. He was elected as a corresponding member of the Academy of Sciences of the Soviet Union in 1984 and as a full member in 1991. In 1992, Zakharov became a professor of mathematics at the University of Arizona, and in 2004 he became the director of the Mathematical Physics Sector at the Lebedev Physical Institute.

== Awards and honors ==
- State Prize for research in Plasma Theory, USSR, 1987
- Order of Honors from the State, USSR, 1989
- State Prize of Russian Federation for research in Soliton Theory, Russia, 1993
- Order for the Service to Russian federation, awarded to 60th anniversary, 1999
- Dirac Medal of the Abdus Salam International Center for Theoretical Physics, Trieste, Italy, 2003
- Namesake of asteroid 7153 Vladzakharov
- Fellow of the American Mathematical Society, 2012

== Selected bibliography ==
- S. P. Novikov, S. V. Manakov, L. P. Pitaevskii, V. E. Zakharov, Theory of Solitons: The Inverse Scattering Method, Springer-Verlag (1984), ISBN 0-306-10977-8
- V. E. Zakharov, What is Integrability?, Springer-Verlag (1991), ISBN 0-387-51964-5
- V. E. Zakharov, V. S. L'vov, G. Falkovich, Kolmogorov Spectra of Turbulence I: Wave Turbulence, Springer-Verlag (1992), ISBN 0-387-54533-6
- Vladimir Zakharov, The Paradise for Clouds, Ancient Purple Translations (2009), ISBN 0-9563075-0-7

== See also ==
- Zakharov system
- Zakharov–Schulman system
