= Resonant interaction =

Interaction of multiple waves in a nonlinear system

In nonlinear systems a resonant interaction is the interaction of three or more waves, usually but not always of small amplitude. Resonant interactions occur when a simple set of criteria coupling wave vectors and the dispersion equation are met. The simplicity of the criteria make technique popular in multiple fields. Its most prominent and well-developed forms appear in the study of gravity waves, but also finds numerous applications from astrophysics and biology to engineering and medicine. Theoretical work on partial differential equations provides insights into chaos theory; there are curious links to number theory. Resonant interactions allow waves to (elastically) scatter, diffuse or to become unstable. Diffusion processes are responsible for the eventual thermalization of most nonlinear systems; instabilities offer insight into high-dimensional chaos and turbulence.

== Discussion ==
The underlying concept is that when the sum total of the energy and momentum of several vibrational modes sum to zero, they are free to mix together via nonlinearities in the system under study. Modes for which the energy and momentum do not sum to zero cannot interact, as this would imply a violation of energy/momentum conservation. The momentum of a wave is understood to be given by its wave vector $k$ and its energy $\omega$ follows from the dispersion relation for the system.

For example, for three waves in continuous media, the resonant condition is conventionally written as the requirement that $k_1\pm k_2 \pm k_3=0$ and also $\omega_1\pm\omega_2 \pm \omega_3=0$, the minus sign being taken depending on how energy is redistributed among the waves. For waves in discrete media, such as in computer simulations on a lattice, or in (nonlinear) solid-state systems, the wave vectors are quantized, and the normal modes can be called phonons. The Brillouin zone defines an upper bound on the wave vector, and waves can interact when they sum to integer multiples of the Brillouin vectors (Umklapp scattering).

Although three-wave systems provide the simplest form of resonant interactions in waves, not all systems have three-wave interactions. For example, the deep-water wave equation, a continuous-media system, does not have a three-wave interaction. The Fermi–Pasta–Ulam–Tsingou problem, a discrete-media system, does not have a three-wave interaction. It does have a four-wave interaction, but this is not enough to thermalize the system; that requires a six-wave interaction. As a result, the eventual thermalization time goes as the inverse eighth power of the coupling—clearly, a very long time for weak coupling—thus allowing the famous FPUT recurrences to dominate on "normal" time scales.

== Hamiltonian formulation ==
In many cases, the system under study can be readily expressed in a Hamiltonian formalism. When this is possible, a set of manipulations can be applied, having the form of a generalized, non-linear Fourier transform. These manipulations are closely related to the inverse scattering method.

A particularly simple example can be found in the treatment of deep water waves. In such a case, the system can be expressed in terms of a Hamiltonian, formulated in terms of canonical coordinates $p,q$. To avoid notational confusion, write $\psi,\phi$ for these two; they are meant to be conjugate variables satisfying Hamilton's equation. These are to be understood as functions of the configuration space coordinates $\vec{x},t$, i.e. functions of space and time. Taking the Fourier transform, write

$$\hat \psi(\vec k) = \int e^{-i\vec k\cdot \vec x}\; \psi(\vec x) \;dx$$

and likewise for $\hat \phi(\vec k)$. Here, $\vec k$ is the wave vector. When "on shell", it is related to the angular frequency $\omega$ by the dispersion relation. The ladder operators follow in the canonical fashion:

$$\hat \phi(\vec k) = \sqrt {2f(\omega)} \;\;\left(a_{k} + a^*_{-k}\right)$$
$$\hat \psi(\vec k) = -i\sqrt {\frac{2}{f(\omega)}} \;\;\left(a_{k} - a^*_{-k}\right)$$

with $2f(\omega)$ some function of the angular frequency. The $a,a^*$ correspond to the normal modes of the linearized system. The Hamiltonian (the energy) can now be written in terms of these raising and lowering operators (sometimes called the "action density variables") as

$$H = H_0(a,a^*) + \epsilon H_1(a,a^*)$$

Here, the first term $H_0(a,a^*)$ is quadratic in $a,a^*$ and represents the linearized theory, while the non-linearities are captured in $H_1(a,a^*)$, which is cubic or higher-order.

Given the above as the starting point, the system is then decomposed into "free" and "bound" modes. The bound modes have no independent dynamics of their own; for example, the higher harmonics of a soliton solution are bound to the fundamental mode, and cannot interact. This can be recognized by the fact that they do not follow the dispersion relation, and have no resonant interactions. In this case, canonical transformations are applied, with the goal of eliminating terms that are non-interacting, leaving free modes. That is, one re-writes $a\to a^\prime=a+\mathcal{O}(\epsilon)$ and likewise for $a^*$, and rewrites the system in terms of these new, "free" (or at least, freer) modes. Properly done, this leaves $H_1$ expressed only with terms that are resonantly interacting. If $H_1$ is cubic, these are then the three-wave terms; if quartic, these are the four-wave terms, and so on. Canonical transformations can be repeated to obtain higher-order terms, as long as the lower-order resonant interactions are not damaged, and one skillfully avoids the small divisor problem, which occurs when there are near-resonances. The terms themselves give the rate or speed of the mixing, and are sometimes called transfer coefficients or the transfer matrix. At the conclusion, one obtains an equation for the time evolution of the normal modes, corrected by scattering terms. Picking out one of the modes out of the bunch, call it $a_1$ below, the time evolution has the generic form

$$\frac{\partial a_1}{\partial t} + i\omega_1 = -i\int dk_2\cdots dk_n \;T_{1\cdots n} \;a^\pm_2\cdots a^\pm_n \; \delta_{1\pm 2 \pm \cdots \pm n}$$

with $T_{1\cdots n}$ the transfer coefficients for the n-wave interaction, and the $\delta_{1\pm 2 \pm \cdots\pm n}=\delta(k_1 \pm k_2 \pm \cdots \pm k_n)$ capturing the notion of the conservation of energy/momentum implied by the resonant interaction. Here $a^\pm_k$ is either $a$ or $a^*$ as appropriate. For deep-water waves, the above is called the Zakharov equation, named after Vladimir E. Zakharov.

== History ==
Resonant interactions were first considered and described by Henri Poincaré in the 19th century, in the analysis of perturbation series describing 3-body planetary motion. The first-order terms in the perturbative series can be understood for form a matrix; the eigenvalues of the matrix correspond to the fundamental modes in the perturbated solution. Poincare observed that in many cases, there are integer linear combinations of the eigenvalues that sum to zero; this is the original resonant interaction. When in resonance, energy transfer between modes can keep the system in a stable phase-locked state. However, going to second order is challenging in several ways. One is that degenerate solutions are difficult to diagonalize (there is no unique vector basis for the degenerate space). A second issue is that differences appear in the denominator of the second and higher order terms in the perturbation series; small differences lead to the famous small divisor problem. These can be interpreted as corresponding to chaotic behavior. To roughly summarize, precise resonances lead to scattering and mixing; approximate resonances lead to chaotic behavior.

== Applications ==
Resonant interactions have found broad utility in many areas. Below is a selected list of some of these, indicating the broad variety of domains to which the ideas have been applied.

- In deep water, there are no three-wave interactions between surface gravity waves; the shape of the dispersion relation prohibits this. There is, however, a four-wave interaction; it describes the experimentally-observed interaction of obliquely moving waves very well (i.e. with no free parameters or adjustments). The Hamiltonian formalism for deep water waves was given by Zakharov in 1968
- Rogue waves are unusually large and unexpected oceanic surface waves; solitons are implicated, and specifically, the resonant interactions between three of them.
- Rossby waves, also known as planetary waves, describe both the jet-stream and oceanic waves that move along the thermocline. There are three-wave resonant interactions of Rossby waves, and so they are commonly studied as such.
- The resonant interactions of Rossby waves have been observed to have a connection to Diophantine equations, normally considered to be a topic in number theory. Constructive methods for solving Diophantine equations appearing in the context of the resonant wave interactions of various types (including Rossby waves) have been first presented by Kartashova in 1990 and can be found in
- During summertime in shallow coastal waters, low-frequency sound-waves have been observed to propagate in an anomalous fashion. The anomalies are time-dependent, anisotropic, and can exhibit abnormally large attenuation. Resonant interaction between acoustic waves and soliton internal waves have been proposed as the source of these anomalies.
- In astrophysics, non-linear resonant interactions between warping and oscillations in the relativistically spinning accretion disk around a black hole have been proposed as the origin of observed kilohertz quasi-periodic oscillations in low-mass x-ray binaries. The non-linearity providing the coupling is due to general relativity; accretion disks in Newtonian gravity, e.g. Saturn's rings do not have this particular kind of resonant interaction (they do demonstrate many other kinds of resonances, however).
- During spacecraft atmospheric entry, the high speed of the spacecraft heats air to a red-hot plasma. This plasma is impenetrable to radio waves, leading to a radio communications blackout. Resonant interactions that mechanically (acoustically) couple the spacecraft to the plasma have been investigated as a means of punching a hole or tunneling out the radiowave, thus re-establishing radio communications during a critical flight phase.
- Resonant interactions have been proposed as a way of coupling the high spatial resolution of electron microscopes to the high temporal resolution of lasers, allowing precision microscopy in both space and time. The resonant interaction is between free electrons and bound electrons at the surface of a material.
- Charged particles can be accelerated by resonant interaction with electromagnetic waves. Scalar particles (neutral atoms) described by the Klein–Gordon equation can be accelerated by gravitational waves (e.g. those emitted from black hole mergers.)
- The physical basis for macromolecular bioactivity — molecular recognition — the protein-protein and protein-DNA interaction, is poorly understood. Such interactions are known to be electromagnetic (obviously, its "chemistry"), but are otherwise poorly understood (its not "just hydrogen bonds"). The Informational Spectrum Method (ISM) describes such molecular binding in terms of resonant interactions. Given a protein, the valence electrons on various amino acids delocalize, and have some freedom of movement within the protein. Their behavior can be modelled in a relatively straightforward way with an electron-ion pseudopotential (EIIP), one for each distinct amino acid or nucleotide. The result of modelling provides spectra, which can be accessed experimentally, thus confirming numerical results. In addition, the model provides the needed dispersion relation from which the resonant interactions can be deduced. Resonant interactions are obtained by computing cross-spectra. Since resonant interactions mix states (and thus alter entropy), recognition might proceed through entropic forces.
- Resonant interaction between high-frequency electromagnetic fields and cancer cells has been proposed as a method for treating cancer.

== See also ==
- Three-wave equation
- Inverse scattering method
- S-matrix
- Orbital resonance
- Nonlinear resonance
- Tidal resonance
- Arnold tongue
