= Harrison E. Rowe =

American electrical engineer

Harrison Edward Rowe (H. E. Rowe) (January 29, 1927 – October 18, 2018) was an American electrical engineer known for his work in signals, noise, and microwave communications.

== Early years ==
Rowe was born on January 29, 1927, the only child to Edward and Joan Rowe of Chicago, Illinois. Rowe grew up in Chicago and Waukegan, Illinois. He began his university studies at the Massachusetts Institute of Technology in 1943, at the age of 16. He chose to pause his studies and enlist in the United States Navy on his 17th birthday where he served from 1944 to 1946. He returned to MIT, completing his BS, MS, and ScD degrees there between 1948 and 1952.

== Family ==
In 1951, Harrison married Alicia Jane Steeves. Together they had four children, Amy, Alison, Edward and Elizabeth.

== Career ==
After graduation from MIT, he joined Bell Laboratories in New Jersey. While there, he jointly developed with J. M. Manley the Manley–Rowe relations, mathematical expressions developed originally for electrical engineers to predict the amount of energy in a wave that has multiple frequencies. He and Manley received the David Sarnoff Award for "their work on the properties of nonlinear devices resulting in the well-known Manley–Rowe Relations." In 1977 Following his retirement from Bell Labs, he joined Stevens Institute of Technology as a professor of electrical engineering. He remains an emeritus professor.

== Publications ==
=== Books ===
- In 1965 he published Signals and Noise in Communications (Princeton: VanNoatrand) According to WorldCat, the book was published in 10 editions; as of 2014, it was still held in 285 libraries, By 2014, it had received 292 citations in Google Scholar.
- In 1999 he published Electromagnetic Propagation in Multi-Mode Random Media (NY: Wiley), now in 199 libraries.

=== Articles ===
The most widely cited of his over 50 articles, with 583 citations in Google Scholar, is "Some general properties of nonlinear elements-Part I. General energy relations" by Manley and Rowe.

== Honors ==
- David Sarnoff Award
- Fellow, IEEE
