= Duffing equation =

Non-linear second order differential equation and its attractor

Duffing oscillator plot, containing phase plot, trajectory, strange attractor, Poincare section, and double well potential plot. The parameters are $\alpha=-1$, $\beta=0.25$, $\delta=0.1$, $\gamma=2.5$, and $\omega=2$.

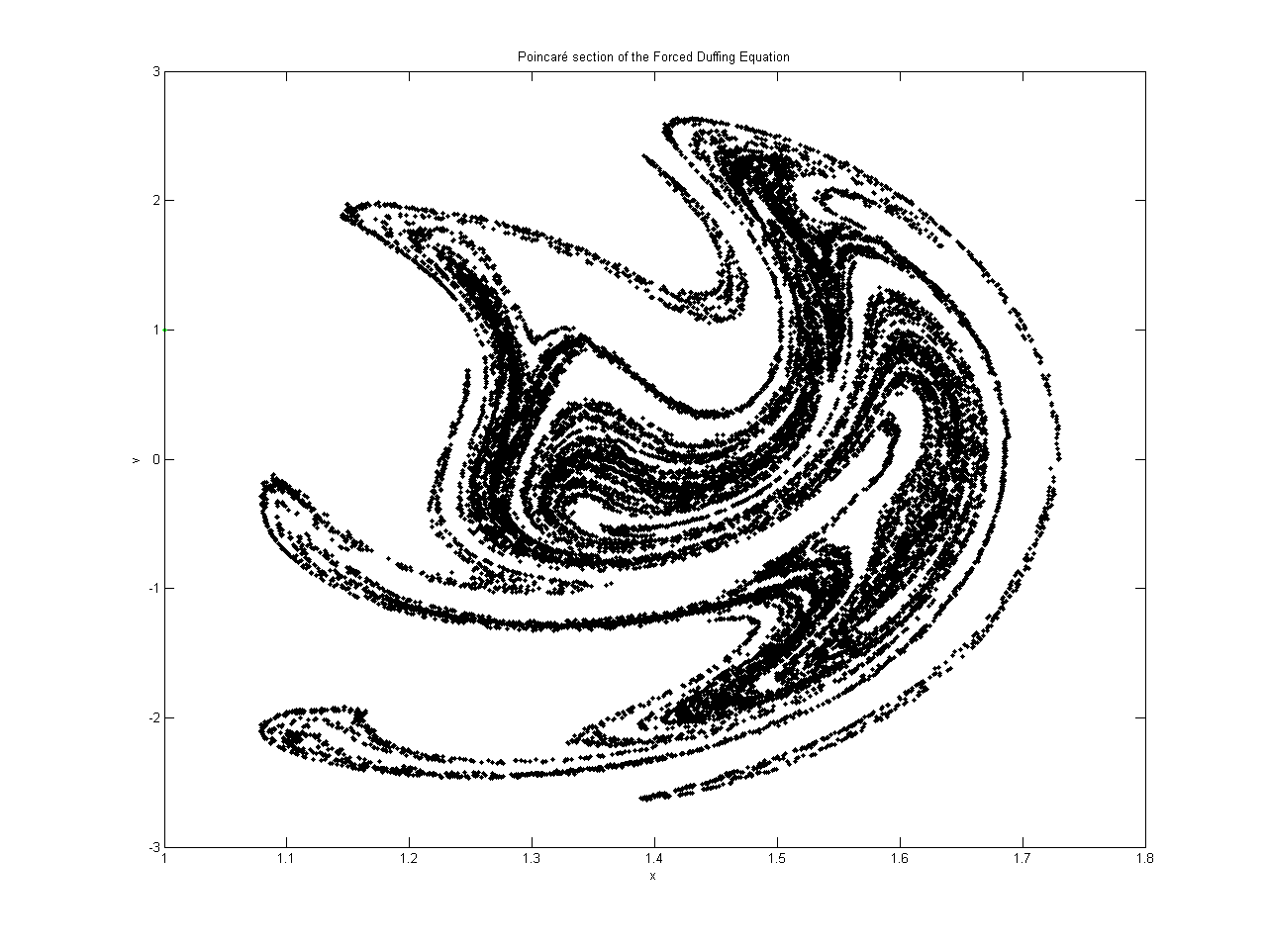
A Poincaré section of the forced Duffing equation suggesting chaotic behaviour ($\alpha = 1$, $\beta = 5$, $\delta = 0.02$, $\gamma = 8$, and $\omega = 0.5$).

The strange attractor of the Duffing oscillator, through 4 periods ($8\pi$ time). Coloration shows how the points flow. ($\alpha = -1$, $\beta = 1$, $\delta = 0.02$, $\gamma = 3$, $\omega = 1$. The animation has time offset so driving force is $\sin(\omega t)$ rather than $\cos(\omega t)$.)

The Duffing equation (or Duffing oscillator), named after Georg Duffing (1861–1944), is a non-linear second-order differential equation used to model certain damped and driven oscillators. The equation is given by
$$\ddot{x} + \delta \dot{x} + \alpha x + \beta x^3 = \gamma \cos (\omega t),$$
where the (unknown) function $x = x(t)$ is the displacement at time t, $\dot{x}$ is the first derivative of $x$ with respect to time, i.e. velocity, and $\ddot{x}$ is the second time-derivative of $x,$ i.e. acceleration. The numbers $\delta,$ $\alpha,$ $\beta,$ $\gamma$ and $\omega$ are given constants.

The equation describes the motion of a damped oscillator with a more complex potential than in simple harmonic motion (which corresponds to the case $\beta=\delta=\gamma=0$ and $\alpha>0$); in physical terms, it models, for example, an elastic pendulum whose spring's stiffness does not exactly obey Hooke's law.

The Duffing equation is an example of a dynamical system that exhibits chaotic behavior. Moreover, the Duffing system presents in the frequency response the jump resonance phenomenon that is a sort of frequency hysteresis behaviour.

== Parameters ==
The parameters in the above equation are:

- $\delta$ controls the amount of damping,
- $\alpha$ controls the linear stiffness,
- $\beta$ controls the amount of non-linearity in the restoring force; if $\beta=0,$ the Duffing equation describes a damped and driven simple harmonic oscillator,
- $\gamma$ is the amplitude of the periodic driving force; if $\gamma=0$ the system is without a driving force, and
- $\omega$ is the angular frequency of the periodic driving force.

The Duffing equation can be seen as describing the oscillations of a mass attached to a nonlinear spring and a linear damper. The restoring force provided by the nonlinear spring is then $\alpha x + \beta x^3.$

When $\alpha>0$ and $\beta>0$ the spring is called a hardening spring. Conversely, for $\beta<0$ it is a softening spring (still with $\alpha>0$). Consequently, the adjectives hardening and softening are used with respect to the Duffing equation in general, dependent on the values of $\beta$ (and $\alpha$).

The number of parameters in the Duffing equation can be reduced by two through scaling (in accord with the Buckingham π theorem), e.g. the excursion $x$ and time $t$ can be scaled as: $\tau = t \sqrt{\alpha}$ and $y = x \alpha/\gamma,$ assuming $\alpha$ is positive (other scalings are possible for different ranges of the parameters, or for different emphasis in the problem studied). Then:
$$\ddot{y} + 2 \eta\, \dot{y} + y + \varepsilon\, y^3 = \cos(\sigma\tau),$$
where

- $\eta = \frac{\delta}{2\sqrt{\alpha}},$
- $\varepsilon = \frac{\beta\gamma^2}{\alpha^3},$ and
- $\sigma = \frac{\omega}{\sqrt{\alpha}}.$

The dots denote differentiation of $y(\tau)$ with respect to $\tau.$ This shows that the solutions to the forced and damped Duffing equation can be described in terms of the three parameters ($\varepsilon$, $\eta$, and $\sigma$) and two initial conditions (i.e. for $y(t_0)$ and $\dot{y}(t_0)$).

== Methods of solution ==
In general, the Duffing equation does not admit an exact symbolic solution. However, many approximate methods work well:

- Expansion in a Fourier series may provide an equation of motion to arbitrary precision.
- The $x^3$ term, also called the Duffing term, can be approximated as small and the system treated as a perturbed simple harmonic oscillator.
- The Frobenius method yields a complex but workable solution.
- Any of the various numeric methods such as Euler's method and Runge–Kutta methods can be used.
- The homotopy analysis method (HAM) has also been reported for obtaining approximate solutions of the Duffing equation, also for strong nonlinearity.

In the special case of the undamped ($\delta = 0$) and undriven ($\gamma = 0$) Duffing equation, an exact solution can be obtained using Jacobi's elliptic functions.

== Boundedness of the solution for the unforced oscillator ==
=== Undamped oscillator ===
Multiplication of the undamped and unforced Duffing equation, $\gamma = \delta = 0,$ with $\dot{x}$ gives:
$$\begin{align}
& \dot{x} \left( \ddot{x} + \alpha x + \beta x^3 \right) = 0
\\[1ex]
\Longrightarrow {} &
\frac{\mathrm{d}}{\mathrm{d}t} \left[ \frac 1 2 \left( \dot{x} \right)^2 + \frac 1 2 \alpha x^2 + \frac 1 4 \beta x^4 \right] = 0
\\[1ex]
\Longrightarrow {} &
\frac 1 2 \left( \dot{x} \right)^2 + \frac 1 2 \alpha x^2 + \frac 1 4 \beta x^4 = H,
\end{align}$$
with H a constant. The value of H is determined by the initial conditions $x(0)$ and $\dot{x}(0).$

The substitution $y=\dot{x}$ in H shows that the system is Hamiltonian:
$$\begin{align}
&\dot{x} = + \frac{\partial H}{\partial y}, \qquad \dot{y} = - \frac{\partial H}{\partial x} \\[1ex]
\Longrightarrow {} & H = \tfrac 1 2 y^2 + \tfrac 1 2 \alpha x^2 + \tfrac 1 4 \beta x^4.
\end{align}$$

When both $\alpha$ and $\beta$ are positive, the solution is bounded:
$$|x| \leq \sqrt{2H/\alpha} \qquad \text{ and } \qquad |\dot{x}| \leq \sqrt{2H},$$
with the Hamiltonian H being positive. This bound on $x$ comes from dropping the term with $\beta$. Including it gives a smaller but more complicated bound, by solving $(\beta/4)x^4 + (\alpha/2)x^2 - H = 0$, a quadratic equation for $x^2$.

=== Damped oscillator ===
Similarly, the damped oscillator converges globally, by Lyapunov function method
$$\begin{align}
& \dot{x} \left( \ddot{x} + \delta \dot{x} + \alpha x + \beta x^3 \right) = 0
\\[1ex]
\Longrightarrow{}&
\frac{\mathrm{d}}{\mathrm{d}t} \left[ \frac 1 2 \left( \dot{x} \right)^2 + \frac 1 2 \alpha x^2 + \frac 1 4 \beta x^4 \right]
= -\delta\, \left(\dot{x}\right)^2
\\[1ex]
\Longrightarrow{}&
\frac{\mathrm{d}H}{\mathrm{d}t} = -\delta\, \left(\dot{x}\right)^2 \le 0,
\end{align}$$
since $\delta \ge 0$ for damping. Without forcing the damped Duffing oscillator will end up at (one of) its stable equilibrium point(s). The equilibrium points, stable and unstable, are at $\alpha x + \beta x^3 = 0.$ If $\alpha>0$ the stable equilibrium is at $x=0.$ If $\alpha < 0$ and $\beta > 0$ the stable equilibria are at $x = +\sqrt{-\alpha/\beta}$ and $x = -\sqrt{-\alpha/\beta}.$

== Frequency response ==
The forced Duffing oscillator with cubic nonlinearity is described by the following ordinary differential equation:
$$\ddot{x} + \delta \dot{x} + \alpha x + \beta x^3 = \gamma \cos (\omega t).$$

The frequency response of this oscillator describes the amplitude $z$ of steady state response of the equation (i.e. $x(t)$) at a given frequency of excitation $\omega.$ For a linear oscillator with $\beta=0,$ the frequency response is also linear. However, for a nonzero cubic coefficient $\beta$, the frequency response becomes nonlinear. Depending on the type of nonlinearity, the Duffing oscillator can show hardening, softening or mixed hardening–softening frequency response. Anyway, using the homotopy analysis method or harmonic balance, one can derive a frequency response equation in the following form:
$$\left[\left(\omega^2 - \alpha - \tfrac{3}{4} \beta z^2\right)^2 + \left(\delta\omega\right)^2\right] \, z^2 = \gamma^2.$$

For the parameters of the Duffing equation, the above algebraic equation gives the steady state oscillation amplitude $z$ at a given excitation frequency.

Derivation of the frequency response

Using the method of harmonic balance, an approximate solution to the Duffing equation is sought of the form:
$$x = a\, \cos(\omega t) + b\, \sin(\omega t) = z\, \cos(\omega t - \phi),$$
with $z^2=a^2+b^2$ and $\tan\phi = \frac{b}{a}.$

Application in the Duffing equation leads to:
$$\begin{align}
& \left( -\omega^2\, a + \omega\,\delta\,b + \alpha\,a + \tfrac34\,\beta\,a^3 + \tfrac34\,\beta\,a\,b^2 - \gamma \right)\,
\cos \left( \omega\,t \right)
\\
& + \left( -\omega^2\, b - \omega\,\delta\,a + \tfrac34\,\beta\,b^3 + \alpha\,b + \tfrac34\,\beta\,a^2\,b \right)\,
\sin \left( \omega\,t \right)
\\
& + \left( \tfrac14\,\beta\,a^3 - \tfrac34\,\beta\,a\,b^2 \right)\, \cos \left( 3 \omega t \right)
+ \left( \tfrac34\,\beta\,a^2\,b - \tfrac14\,\beta\,b^3 \right)\, \sin \left( 3 \omega t \right)
= 0.
\end{align}$$

Neglecting the superharmonics at $3\omega,$ the two terms preceding $\cos(\omega t)$ and $\sin(\omega t)$ have to be zero. As a result,
$$\begin{align}
& -\omega^2\, a + \omega\,\delta\,b + \alpha\,a + \tfrac34\,\beta\,a^3 + \tfrac34\,\beta\,a\,b^2 = \gamma
\qquad \text{and}
\\
& -\omega^2\, b - \omega\,\delta\,a + \tfrac34\,\beta\,b^3 + \alpha\,b + \tfrac34\,\beta\,a^2\,b = 0.
\end{align}$$

Squaring both equations and adding leads to the amplitude frequency response:
$$\left[\left(\omega^2-\alpha-\frac{3}{4}\beta z^2\right)^2 + \left(\delta\omega\right)^2\right]\,z^2=\gamma^2,$$
as stated above.

Frequency response $z/\gamma$ as a function of $\omega/\sqrt{\alpha}$ for the Duffing equation, with $\alpha = \gamma=1$ and damping $\delta = 0.1$. The dashed parts of the frequency response are unstable.

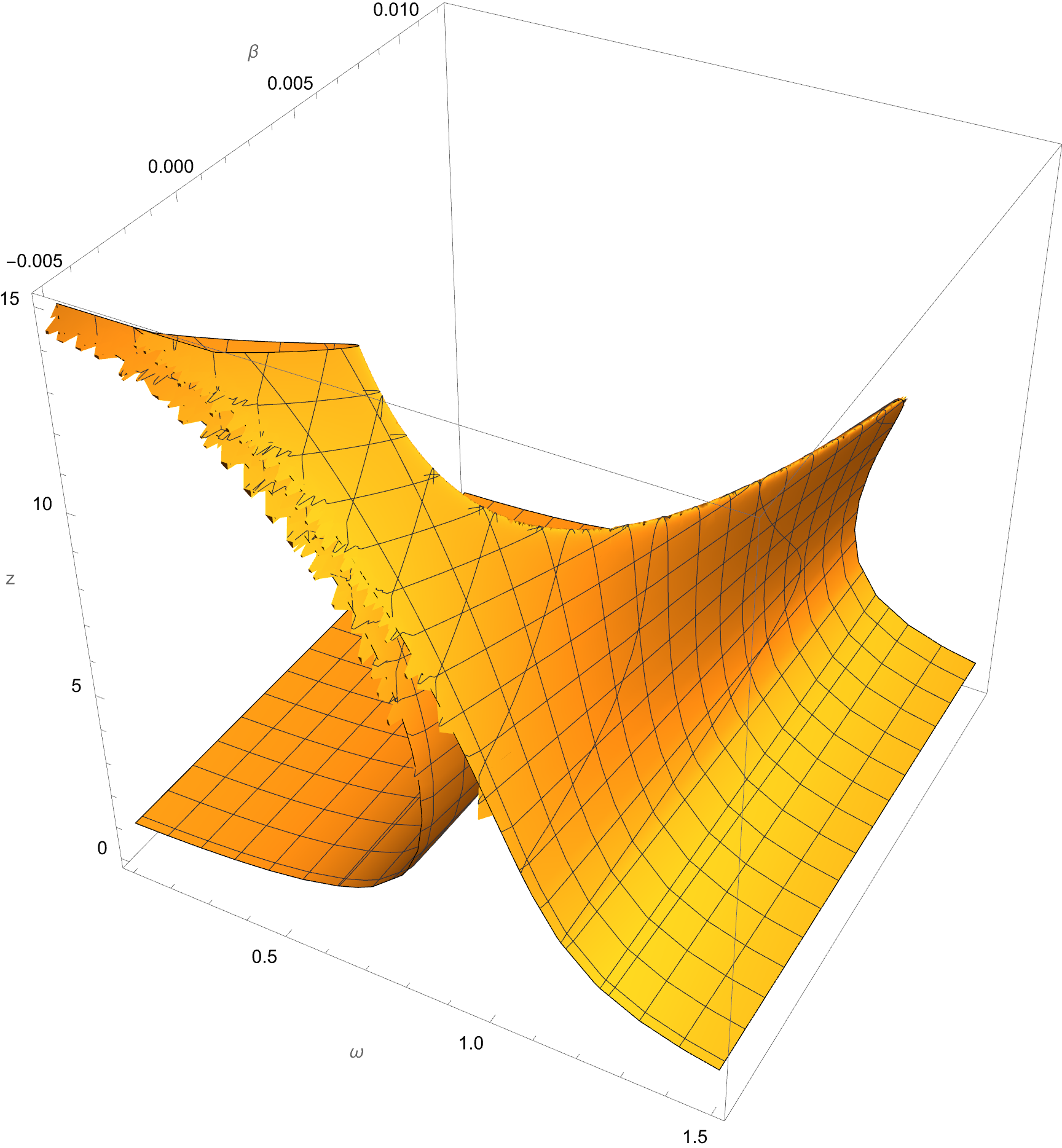
The same plot as a 3D diagram. Varying $\beta$ is shown along a separate axis.

=== Graphically solving for frequency response ===
We may graphically solve for $z^2$ as the intersection of two curves in the $(z^2, y)$ plane:
$$\begin{cases}
y = \left(\omega^2-\alpha-\frac{3}{4} \beta z^2\right)^{2}+\left(\delta\omega\right)^2 \\[1ex]
y = \dfrac{\gamma^2}{z^2}
\end{cases}$$
For fixed $\alpha, \delta, \gamma$, the second curve is a fixed hyperbola in the first quadrant. The first curve is a parabola with shape $y = \tfrac{9}{16}\beta^2 (z^2)^2$, and apex at location $(\tfrac{4}{3\beta}(\omega^2 - \alpha), \delta^2 \omega^2)$. If we fix $\beta$ and vary $\omega$, then the apex of the parabola moves along the line $y = \tfrac{3}{4}\beta\delta^2 (z^2)+ \delta^2\alpha$.

Graphically, then, we see that if $\beta$ is a large positive number, then as $\omega$ varies, the parabola intersects the hyperbola at one point, then three points, then one point again. Similarly we can analyze the case when $\beta$ is a large negative number.

=== Jumps ===
Jumps in the frequency response. The parameters are: $\alpha = \gamma = 1,$, $\beta = 0.04$, and $\delta = 0.1$.

For certain ranges of the parameters in the Duffing equation, the frequency response may no longer be a single-valued function of forcing frequency $\omega.$ For a hardening spring oscillator ($\alpha>0$ and large enough positive $\beta>\beta_{c+} > 0$) the frequency response overhangs to the high-frequency side, and to the low-frequency side for the softening spring oscillator ($\alpha>0$ and $\beta<\beta_{c-} < 0$). The lower overhanging side is unstable – i.e. the dashed-line parts in the figures of the frequency response – and cannot be realized for a sustained time. Consequently, the jump phenomenon shows up:

- when the angular frequency $\omega$ is slowly increased (with other parameters fixed), the response amplitude $z$ drops at A suddenly to B,
- if the frequency $\omega$ is slowly decreased, then at C the amplitude jumps up to D, thereafter following the upper branch of the frequency response.

The jumps A–B and C–D do not coincide, so the system shows hysteresis depending on the frequency sweep direction.

=== Transition to chaos ===
The above analysis assumed that the base frequency response dominates (necessary for performing harmonic balance), and higher frequency responses are negligible. This assumption fails to hold when the forcing is sufficiently strong. Higher order harmonics cannot be neglected, and the dynamics become chaotic. There are different possible transitions to chaos, most commonly by successive period doubling.

== Examples ==
Time traces and phase portraits

period-1 oscillation at $\gamma=0.20$

period-2 oscillation at $\gamma=0.28$

period-4 oscillation at $\gamma=0.29$

period-5 oscillation at $\gamma=0.37$

chaos at $\gamma=0.50$

period-2 oscillation at $\gamma=0.65$

Some typical examples of the time series and phase portraits of the Duffing equation, showing the appearance of subharmonics through period-doubling bifurcation – as well chaotic behavior – are shown in the figures below. The forcing amplitude increases from $\gamma = 0.20$ to $\gamma = 0.65$. The other parameters have the values: $\alpha = -1$, $\beta = +1$, $\delta = 0.3$ and $\omega = 1.2$. The initial conditions are $x(0) = 1$ and $\dot{x}(0) = 0.$ The red dots in the phase portraits are at times $t$ which are an integer multiple of the period $T = 2\pi / \omega$.
