= List of nonlinear partial differential equations =

See also Nonlinear partial differential equation, List of partial differential equation topics and List of nonlinear ordinary differential equations.

== A–F ==
Name	Dim	Equation	Applications
Bateman-Burgers equation	1+1	$\displaystyle u_t+uu_x=\nu u_{xx}$	Fluid mechanics
Benjamin–Bona–Mahony	1+1	$\displaystyle u_t+u_x+uu_x-u_{xxt}=0$	Fluid mechanics
Benjamin–Ono	1+1	$\displaystyle u_t+Hu_{xx}+uu_x=0$	internal waves in deep water
Boomeron	1+1	$\displaystyle u_t=\mathbf{b}\cdot\mathbf{v}_x, \quad \displaystyle \mathbf{v}_{xt}=u_{xx}\mathbf{b}+\mathbf{a}\times\mathbf{v}_x- 2\mathbf{v}\times(\mathbf{v}\times\mathbf{b})$	Solitons
Boltzmann equation	1+6	$\frac{\partial f_i}{\partial t} + \frac{\mathbf{p}_i}{m_i}\cdot\nabla f_i + \mathbf{F}\cdot\frac{\partial f_i}{\partial \mathbf{p}_i} = \left(\frac{\partial f_i}{\partial t} \right)_\mathrm{coll},$ $\left(\frac{\partial f_i}{\partial t} \right)_{\mathrm{coll}} = \sum_{j=1}^n \iint g_{ij} I_{ij}(g_{ij}, \Omega)[f'_i f'_j - f_if_j] \,d\Omega\,d^3\mathbf{p'}$	Statistical mechanics
Born–Infeld	1+1	$\displaystyle (1-u_t^2)u_{xx} +2u_xu_tu_{xt}-(1+u_x^2)u_{tt}=0$	Electrodynamics
Boussinesq	1+1	$\displaystyle u_{tt} - u_{xx} - u_{xxxx} - 3(u^2)_{xx} = 0$	Fluid mechanics
Boussinesq type equation	1+1	$\displaystyle u_{tt}-u_{xx}-2 \alpha (u u_x)_{x}-\beta u_{xxtt}=0$	Fluid mechanics
Buckmaster	1+1	$\displaystyle u_t=(u^4)_{xx}+(u^3)_x$	Thin viscous fluid sheet flow
Cahn–Hilliard equation	Any	$\displaystyle c_t = D\nabla^2\left(c^3-c-\gamma\nabla^2 c\right)$	Phase separation
Calabi flow	Any	$\frac{\partial g_{ij}}{\partial t}=(\Delta R)g_{ij}$	Calabi–Yau manifolds
Camassa–Holm	1+1	$u_t + 2\kappa u_x - u_{xxt} + 3 u u_x = 2 u_x u_{xx} + u u_{xxx}\,$	Peakons
Carleman	1+1	$\displaystyle u_t+u_x=v^2-u^2=v_x-v_t$	
Cauchy momentum	any	$\displaystyle \rho \left(\frac{\partial \mathbf{v}}{\partial t} + \mathbf{v} \cdot \nabla \mathbf{v}\right) = \nabla \cdot \sigma + \rho\mathbf{f}$	Momentum transport
Chafee–Infante equation		$u_t-u_{xx}+\lambda(u^3-u)=0$	
Clairaut equation	any	$x\cdot Du+f(Du)=u$	Differential geometry
Clarke's equation	1+1	$(\theta_t-\gamma \delta e^{\theta})_{tt}=\nabla^2(\theta_t-\delta e^\theta)$	Combustion
Complex Monge–Ampère	Any	$\displaystyle \det(\partial_{i\bar j}\varphi) =$ lower order terms	Calabi conjecture
Constant astigmatism	1+1	$z_{yy} + \left(\frac{1}{z}\right)_{xx} + 2 = 0$	Differential geometry
Davey–Stewartson	1+2	$\displaystyle i u_t + c_0 u_{xx} + u_{yy} = c_1 |u|^2 u + c_2 u \varphi_x, \quad \displaystyle \varphi_{xx} + c_3 \varphi_{yy} = ( |u|^2 )_x$	Finite depth waves
Degasperis–Procesi	1+1	$\displaystyle u_t - u_{xxt} + 4u u_x = 3 u_x u_{xx} + u u_{xxx}$	Peakons
Dispersive long wave	1+1	$\displaystyle u_t=(u^2-u_x+2w)_x$, $w_t=(2uw+w_x)_x$	
Drinfeld–Sokolov–Wilson	1+1	$\displaystyle u_t=3ww_x, \quad \displaystyle w_t=2w_{xxx}+2uw_x+u_xw$	
Dym equation	1+1	$\displaystyle u_t = u^3u_{xxx}.\,$	Solitons
Eckhaus equation	1+1	$iu_t+u_{xx}+2|u|^2_xu+|u|^4u=0$	Integrable systems
Eikonal equation	any	$\displaystyle |\nabla u(x)|=F(x), \ x\in \Omega$	optics
Einstein field equations	Any	$\displaystyle R_{\mu\nu} - {\textstyle 1 \over 2}R\,g_{\mu\nu}+\Lambda g_{\mu\nu} = \frac{8\pi G}{c^{4}} T_{\mu\nu}$	General relativity
Erdogan–Chatwin equation	1+1	$\varphi_t = (\varphi_x + a\varphi_x^3)_x$	Fluid dynamics
Ernst equation	2	$\displaystyle \Re(u)(u_{rr}+u_r/r+u_{zz}) = (u_r)^2+(u_z)^2$	
Estevez–Mansfield–Clarkson equation		$U_{tyyy}+\beta U_y U_{yt}+\beta U_{yy} U_t+U_{tt}=0 \text{ in which } U=u(x,y,t)$	
Euler equations	1+3	$\frac{\partial\rho}{\partial t}+\nabla\cdot(\rho\mathbf{u})=0,\quad \rho\left(\frac{\partial\mathbf{u}}{\partial t}+\mathbf{v}\cdot\nabla\mathbf{v}\right)=-\nabla p + \rho\mathbf{f},\quad \frac{\partial s}{\partial t}+\mathbf{v}\cdot\nabla s=0$	non-viscous fluids
Fisher's equation	1+1	$\displaystyle u_t=u(1-u)+u_{xx}$	Gene propagation
FitzHugh–Nagumo model	1+1	$\displaystyle u_t=u_{xx}+u(u-a)(1-u)+w, \quad \displaystyle w_t=\varepsilon u$	Biological neuron model
Föppl–von Kármán equations		$\frac{Eh^3}{12(1-\nu^2)}\nabla^4 w-h\frac{\partial}{\partial x_\beta}\left(\sigma_{\alpha\beta}\frac{\partial w}{\partial x_\alpha}\right)=P, \quad \frac{\partial\sigma_{\alpha\beta}}{\partial x_\beta}=0$	Solid Mechanics
Fujita–Storm equation		$$u_{t}=a (u^{-2} u_x)_x$$	

== G–K ==
Name	Dim	Equation	Applications
G equation	1+3	$G_t + \mathbf{v}\cdot\nabla G = S_L(G) |\nabla G|$	turbulent combustion
Generic scalar transport	1+3	$\displaystyle \varphi_t + \nabla \cdot f(t,x,\varphi,\nabla\varphi) = g(t,x,\varphi)$	transport
Ginzburg–Landau	1+3	$\displaystyle \alpha \psi + \beta |\psi|^2 \psi + \tfrac{1}{2m} \left(-i\hbar\nabla - 2e\mathbf{A} \right)^2 \psi = 0$	Superconductivity
Gross–Pitaevskii	1 + n	$\displaystyle i\partial_t\psi = \left (-\tfrac12\nabla^2 + V(x) + g|\psi|^2 \right ) \psi$	Bose–Einstein condensate
Gyrokinetics equation	1 + 5	${\displaystyle {\frac {\partial h_{s}}{\partial t}}+\left(v_{||}{\hat {b}}+{\vec {V}}_{ds}+\left\langle {\vec {V}}_{\phi }\right\rangle _{\varphi }\right)\cdot {\vec {\nabla }}_{\vec {R}}h_{s}-\sum _{s'}\left\langle C\left[h_{s},h_{s'}\right]\right\rangle _{\varphi }={\frac {Z_{s}ef_{s0}}{T_{s}}}{\frac {\partial \left\langle \phi \right\rangle _{\varphi }}{\partial t}}-{\frac {\partial f_{s0}}{\partial \psi }}\left\langle {\vec {V}}_{\phi }\right\rangle _{\varphi }\cdot {\vec {\nabla }}\psi }$	Microturbulence in plasma
Guzmán	1 + n	$\displaystyle J_t+gJ_x+1/2\sigma^2J_{xx}-\lambda\sigma^2(J_x)^2+f=0$	Hamilton–Jacobi–Bellman equation for risk aversion
Hartree equation	Any	$\displaystyle i\partial_tu + \Delta u= \left (\pm |x|^{-n} |u|^2 \right) u$	
Hasegawa–Mima	1+3	$\displaystyle 0 = \frac{\partial}{\partial t} \left( \nabla^2 \varphi - \varphi \right) - \left[ \left( \nabla\varphi \times \hat{\mathbf{z}} \right)\cdot \nabla \right] \left[ \nabla^2 \varphi - \ln \left(\frac{n_0}{\omega_{ci}}\right)\right]$	Turbulence in plasma
Heisenberg ferromagnet	1+1	$\displaystyle \mathbf{S}_t=\mathbf{S}\wedge \mathbf{S}_{xx}.$	Magnetism
Hicks	1+1	$\psi_{rr} - \psi_r/r + \psi_{zz} = r^2 \mathrm{d}H/\mathrm{d} \psi - \Gamma \mathrm{d} \Gamma/\mathrm{d}\psi$	Fluid dynamics
Hunter–Saxton	1+1	$\displaystyle \left (u_t + u u_x \right )_x = \tfrac{1}{2} u_x^2$	Liquid crystals
Ishimori equation	1+2	$\displaystyle \mathbf{S}_t = \mathbf{S}\wedge \left(\mathbf{S}_{xx} + \mathbf{S}_{yy}\right)+ u_x\mathbf{S}_y + u_y\mathbf{S}_x,\quad \displaystyle u_{xx}-\alpha^2 u_{yy}=-2\alpha^2 \mathbf{S}\cdot\left(\mathbf{S}_x\wedge \mathbf{S}_y\right)$	Integrable systems
Kadomtsev –Petviashvili	1+2	$\displaystyle \partial_x \left (\partial_t u+u \partial_x u+\varepsilon^2\partial_{xxx}u \right )+\lambda\partial_{yy}u=0$	Shallow water waves
Kardar–Parisi–Zhang equation	1+3	$\displaystyle h_t=\nu \nabla^2 h + \lambda (\nabla h)^2 /2+ \eta$	Stochastics
von Karman	2	$\displaystyle \nabla^4 u = E \left (w_{xy}^2-w_{xx}w_{yy} \right ), \quad \nabla^4 w = a+b \left (u_{yy}w_{xx}+u_{xx}w_{yy}-2u_{xy}w_{xy} \right)$	
Kaup	1+1	$\displaystyle f_x=2fgc(x-t)=g_t$	
Kaup–Kupershmidt	1+1	$\displaystyle u_t = u_{xxxxx}+10u_{xxx}u+25u_{xx}u_x+20u^2u_x$	Integrable systems
Klein–Gordon–Maxwell	any	$\displaystyle \nabla^2s= \left (|\mathbf a|^2+1 \right )s, \quad \nabla^2\mathbf a =\nabla(\nabla\cdot\mathbf a)+s^2\mathbf a$	
Klein–Gordon (nonlinear)	any	$\nabla^2u+\lambda u^p=0$	Relativistic quantum mechanics
Khokhlov–Zabolotskaya	1+2	$\displaystyle u_{xt} -(uu_x)_x =u_{yy}$	
Kompaneyets	1+1	$\displaystyle n_{t} =x^{-2}[x^4(n_x+n^2+n)]_x$	Physical kinetics
Korteweg–de Vries (KdV)	1+1	$\displaystyle u_{t}+u_{xxx}-6u u_{x}=0$	Shallow waves, Integrable systems
KdV (super)	1+1	$\displaystyle u_t=6uu_x-u_{xxx}+3ww_{xx}, \quad w_t=3u_xw+6uw_x-4w_{xxx}$	
There are many different variations listed in the article on KdV equations.
Kuramoto–Sivashinsky equation	1 + n	$\displaystyle u_t+\nabla^4u+\nabla^2u+ \tfrac{1}{2}|\nabla u|^2=0$	Combustion

== L–Q ==
Name	Dim	Equation	Applications
Landau–Lifshitz model	1+n	$\displaystyle \frac{\partial \mathbf{S}}{\partial t} = \mathbf{S}\wedge \sum_i\frac{\partial^2 \mathbf{S}}{\partial x_i^{2}} + \mathbf{S}\wedge J\mathbf{S}$	Magnetic field in solids
Lin–Tsien equation	1+2	$\displaystyle 2u_{tx}+u_xu_{xx}-u_{yy}=0$	
Liouville equation	any	$\displaystyle \nabla^2u+e^{\lambda u}=0$	
Liouville–Bratu–Gelfand equation	any	$\nabla^2 \psi + \lambda e^\psi=0$	combustion, astrophysics
Logarithmic Schrödinger equation	any	$i \frac{\partial \psi}{\partial t} + \Delta \psi + \psi \ln |\psi|^2 = 0.$	Superfluids, Quantum gravity
Minimal surface	3	$\displaystyle \operatorname{div}(Du/\sqrt{1+|Du|^2})=0$	minimal surfaces
Monge–Ampère	any	$\displaystyle \det(\partial_{ij}\varphi) =$ lower order terms	
Navier–Stokes (and its derivation)	1+3	$\displaystyle \rho \left( \frac{\partial v_i}{\partial t} + v_j \frac{\partial v_i}{\partial x_j} \right) = - \frac{\partial p}{\partial x_i} + \frac{\partial}{\partial x_j} \left[ \mu \left( \frac{\partial v_i}{\partial x_j} + \frac{\partial v_j}{\partial x_i} \right) + \lambda \frac{\partial v_k}{\partial x_k} \right] + \rho f_i$ + mass conservation: $\frac{\partial \rho}{\partial t} + \frac{\partial \left( \rho\, v_i \right)}{\partial x_i} = 0$ + an equation of state to relate p and ρ, e.g. for an incompressible flow: $\frac{\partial v_i}{\partial x_i} = 0$	Fluid flow, gas flow
Nonlinear Schrödinger (cubic)	1+1	$\displaystyle i\partial_t\psi=-{1\over 2}\partial^2_x\psi+\kappa|\psi|^2 \psi$	optics, water waves
Nonlinear Schrödinger (derivative)	1+1	$\displaystyle i\partial_t\psi=-{1\over 2}\partial^2_x\psi+\partial_x(i\kappa|\psi|^2 \psi)$	optics, water waves
Omega equation	1+3	$\displaystyle \nabla^2\omega + \frac{f^2}{\sigma}\frac{\partial^2\omega}{\partial p^2}$ $\displaystyle = \frac{f}{\sigma}\frac{\partial}{\partial p}\mathbf{V}_g\cdot\nabla_p (\zeta_g + f) + \frac{R}{\sigma p}\nabla^2_p(\mathbf{V}_g\cdot\nabla_p T)$	atmospheric physics
Plateau	2	$\displaystyle (1+u_y^2)u_{xx} -2u_xu_yu_{xy} +(1+u_x^2)u_{yy}=0$	minimal surfaces
Pohlmeyer–Lund–Regge	2	$\displaystyle u_{xx}-u_{yy}\pm \sin u \cos u +\frac{\cos u}{\sin^3 u}(v_x^2-v_y^2)=0,\quad \displaystyle (v_x\cot^2u)_x = (v_y\cot^2 u)_y$	
Porous medium	1+n	$\displaystyle u_t=\Delta(u^\gamma)$	diffusion
Prandtl	1+2	$\displaystyle u_t+uu_x+vu_y=U_t+UU_x+\frac{\mu}{\rho}u_{yy}$, $\displaystyle u_x+v_y=0$	boundary layer

== R–Z, α–ω ==
Name	Dim	Equation	Applications
Rayleigh	1+1	$\displaystyle u_{tt}-u_{xx} = \varepsilon(u_t-u_t^3)$	
Ricci flow	Any	$\displaystyle \partial_t g_{ij}=-2 R_{ij}$	Poincaré conjecture
Richards equation	1+3	$\displaystyle \theta_t=\left[ K(\theta) \left (\psi_z + 1 \right) \right]_z$	Variably saturated flow in porous media
Rosenau–Hyman	1+1	$u_t + a \left(u^n\right)_x + \left(u^n\right)_{xxx} = 0$	compacton solutions
Sawada–Kotera	1+1	$\displaystyle u_t+45u^2u_x+15u_xu_{xx}+15uu_{xxx}+u_{xxxxx}=0$	
Sack–Schamel equation	1+1	$\ddot V + \partial_\eta \left[\frac{1}{1-\ddot V} \partial_\eta \left(\frac{1-\ddot V}{V}\right) \right] =0$	plasmas
Schamel equation	1+1	$\phi_t + (1 + b \sqrt \phi ) \phi_x + \phi_{xxx} = 0$	plasmas, solitons, optics
Schlesinger	Any	$\displaystyle {\partial A_i \over \partial t_j} {\left[ A_i, \ A_j \right] \over t_i - t_j}, \quad i\neq j, \quad {\partial A_i \over \partial t_i} =- \sum_{j=1 \atop j\neq i}^n {\left[ A_i, \ A_j \right] \over t_i - t_j}, \quad 1\leq i, j \leq n$	isomonodromic deformations
Seiberg–Witten	1+3	$\displaystyle D^A\varphi=0, \qquad F^+_A=\sigma(\varphi)$	Seiberg–Witten invariants, QFT
Shallow water	1+2	$\displaystyle \eta_t + (\eta u)_x + (\eta v)_y = 0,\ (\eta u)_t+ \left( \eta u^2 + \frac{1}{2}g \eta^2 \right)_x + (\eta uv)_y = 0,\ (\eta v)_t + (\eta uv)_x + \left(\eta v^2 + \frac{1}{2}g \eta ^2\right)_y = 0$	shallow water waves
Sine–Gordon	1+1	$\displaystyle \, \varphi_{tt}- \varphi_{xx} + \sin\varphi = 0$	Solitons, QFT
Sinh–Gordon	1+1	$\displaystyle u_{xt}= \sinh u$	Solitons, QFT
Sinh–Poisson	1+n	$\displaystyle \nabla^2u+\sinh u=0$	Fluid Mechanics
Swift–Hohenberg	any	$\displaystyle u_t = r u - (1+\nabla^2)^2u + N(u)$	pattern forming
Thomas	2	$\displaystyle u_{xy}+\alpha u_x+\beta u_y+\gamma u_xu_y=0$	
Thirring	1+1	$\displaystyle iu_x+v+u|v|^2=0$, $\displaystyle iv_t+u+v|u|^2=0$	Dirac field, QFT
Toda lattice	any	$\displaystyle \nabla^2\log u_n = u_{n+1}-2u_n+u_{n-1}$	
Veselov–Novikov	1+2	$\displaystyle (\partial_t+\partial_z^3+\partial_{\bar z}^3)v+\partial_z(uv)+\partial_{\bar z}(uw) =0$, $\displaystyle \partial_{\bar z}u=3\partial_zv$, $\displaystyle \partial_zw=3\partial_{\bar z} v$	shallow water waves
Vorticity equation		$\frac{\partial \boldsymbol \omega}{\partial t} + (\mathbf u \cdot \nabla) \boldsymbol \omega = (\boldsymbol \omega \cdot \nabla) \mathbf u - \boldsymbol \omega (\nabla \cdot \mathbf u) + \frac{1}{\rho^2}\nabla \rho \times \nabla p + \nabla \times \left( \frac{\nabla \cdot \tau}{\rho} \right) + \nabla \times \left( \frac{\mathbf{f}}{\rho} \right), \ \boldsymbol{\omega}=\nabla\times\mathbf{u}$	Fluid Mechanics
Wadati–Konno–Ichikawa–Schimizu	1+1	$\displaystyle iu_t+((1+|u|^2)^{-1/2}u)_{xx}=0$	
WDVV equations	Any	$\displaystyle \sum_{\sigma, \tau = 1}^n\left({\partial^3 F \over \partial t^\alpha t^\beta t^\sigma} \eta^{\sigma \tau} {\partial^3 F \over \partial t^\mu t^\nu t^\tau} \right)$ $\displaystyle = \sum_{\sigma, \tau = 1}^n\left({\partial^3 F \over \partial t^\alpha t^\nu t^\sigma} \eta^{\sigma \tau} {\partial^3 F \over \partial t^\mu t^\beta t^\tau} \right)$	Topological field theory, QFT
WZW model	1+1	$S_k(\gamma)= - \, \frac {k}{8\pi} \int_{S^2} d^2x\, \mathcal{K} (\gamma^{-1} \partial^\mu \gamma \, , \, \gamma^{-1} \partial_\mu \gamma) + 2\pi k\, S^{\mathrm WZ}(\gamma)$ $S^{\mathrm WZ}(\gamma) = - \, \frac{1}{48\pi^2} \int_{B^3} d^3y\, \varepsilon^{ijk} \mathcal{K} \left( \gamma^{-1} \, \frac {\partial \gamma} {\partial y^i} \, , \, \left[ \gamma^{-1} \, \frac {\partial \gamma} {\partial y^j} \, , \, \gamma^{-1} \, \frac {\partial \gamma} {\partial y^k} \right] \right)$	QFT
Whitham equation	1+1	$\displaystyle \eta_t + \alpha \eta \eta_x + \int_{-\infty}^{+\infty} K(x-\xi)\, \eta_\xi(\xi,t)\, \text{d}\xi = 0$	water waves
Williams spray equation		$\frac{\partial f_j}{\partial t} + \nabla_x\cdot(\mathbf{v}f_j) + \nabla_v\cdot(F_jf_j) =- \frac{\partial }{\partial r}(R_jf_j) - \frac{\partial }{\partial T}(E_jf_j) + Q_j + \Gamma_j,\ F_j = \dot{\mathbf{v}},\ R_j = \dot{r},\ E_j = \dot{T},\ j = 1,2,...,M$	Combustion
Yamabe	n	$\displaystyle\Delta \varphi+h(x)\varphi = \lambda f(x)\varphi^{(n+2)/(n-2)}$	Differential geometry
Yang–Mills (source-free)	Any	$\displaystyle D_\mu F^{\mu\nu}=0, \quad F_{\mu \nu} = A_{\mu, \nu} - A_{\nu, \mu }+ [A_\mu, \, A_\nu]$	Gauge theory, QFT
Yang–Mills (self-dual/anti-self-dual)	4	$F_{\alpha \beta} = \pm \varepsilon_{\alpha \beta \mu \nu} F^{\mu \nu}, \quad F_{\mu \nu} = A_{\mu, \nu} - A_{\nu, \mu }+ [A_\mu, \, A_\nu]$	Instantons, Donaldson theory, QFT
Yukawa	1+n	$\displaystyle i \partial_t^{}u + \Delta u = -A u,\quad \displaystyle\Box A = m^2_{} A + |u|^2$	Meson-nucleon interactions, QFT
Zakharov system	1+3	$\displaystyle i \partial_t^{} u + \Delta u = un,\quad \displaystyle \Box n = -\Delta (|u|^2_{})$	Langmuir waves
Zakharov–Schulman	1+3	$\displaystyle iu_t + L_1u = \varphi u,\quad \displaystyle L_2 \varphi = L_3( | u |^2)$	Acoustic waves
Zeldovich–Frank-Kamenetskii equation	1+3	$\displaystyle u_t = D\nabla^2 u + \frac{\beta^2}{2}u(1-u) e^{-\beta(1-u)}$	Combustion
Zoomeron	1+1	$\displaystyle (u_{xt}/u)_{tt}-(u_{xt}/u)_{xx} +2(u^2)_{xt}=0$	Solitons
φ^{4} equation	1+1	$\displaystyle \varphi_{tt}-\varphi_{xx}-\varphi+\varphi^3=0$	QFT
σ-model	1+1	$\displaystyle {\mathbf v}_{xt}+({\mathbf v}_x{\mathbf v}_t){\mathbf v}=0$	Harmonic maps, integrable systems, QFT
