= Broers =

Broers is a Dutch patronymic surname meaning "Broer's (son)". Broer and Broeder mean "brother" in Dutch. A nickname for a younger sibling is likely the origin of the given name, which is by now rare in the Netherlands. The surname may sometimes have originated from any of the other meanings of "brother". Variant forms are Broeders, Broer, Broere, Broerse and Broersen. People with this surname include:

- Alec Broers, Baron Broers (born 1938), Australian electrical engineer
- Frank Broers (born 1977), Dutch football defender
- Frans Broers (1944–2013), Dutch writer known as Jacq Vogelaar
- Huub Broers (born 1951), Belgian New Flemish Alliance politician
- Jasper Broers (1682–1716), Flemish landscape and battle painter
- Johnny Broers (born 1951), Dutch racing cyclist
- Leonard Broers (born 1906), Belgian long-distance runner

Broeders

- Ben Broeders (born 1995), Belgian pole vaulter
- Ilse Broeders (born 1977), Dutch bobsledder

Broer

- Bert Broer (1916–1991), Dutch physicist and mathematician, e.g. known for the Broer–Kaup equations
- Christa Broer (born 1945), Dutch writer known as Anna Enquist
- Jan-Martin Bröer (born 1982), German rower

Broerse or Broersen

- Joost Broerse (born 1979), Dutch football defender
- Nadine Broersen (born 1990), Dutch heptathlete and high jumper

== See also ==
- Broers (band), South African music band
- Broer
- Broeren
