= List of partial differential equation topics =

This is a list of partial differential equation topics.

== General topics ==
- Partial differential equation
  - Nonlinear partial differential equation
    - list of nonlinear partial differential equations
- Boundary condition
- Boundary value problem
  - Dirichlet problem, Dirichlet boundary condition
  - Neumann boundary condition
  - Stefan problem
  - Wiener–Hopf problem
- Separation of variables
- Green's function
- Elliptic partial differential equation
- Singular perturbation
- Cauchy–Kovalevskaya theorem
- H-principle
- Atiyah–Singer index theorem
- Bäcklund transform
- Viscosity solution
- Weak solution
- Loewy decomposition of linear differential equations

== Specific partial differential equations ==
- Broer–Kaup equations
- Burgers' equation
- Euler equations
- Fokker–Planck equation
- Hamilton–Jacobi equation, Hamilton–Jacobi–Bellman equation
- Heat equation
- Laplace's equation
  - Laplace operator
  - Harmonic function
  - Spherical harmonic
  - Poisson integral formula
- Klein–Gordon equation
- Korteweg–de Vries equation
  - Modified KdV–Burgers equation
- Maxwell's equations
- Navier–Stokes equations
- Poisson's equation
- Primitive equations (hydrodynamics)
- Schrödinger equation
- Wave equation

== Numerical methods for PDEs ==
- Finite difference
- Finite element method
- Finite volume method
- Boundary element method
- Multigrid
- Spectral method
- Computational fluid dynamics
- Alternating direction implicit

== Related areas of mathematics ==
- Calculus of variations
- Harmonic analysis
- Ordinary differential equation
- Sobolev space
