= Unnormalized KdV equation =

Unnormalized KdV equation is a nonlinear partial differential equation

$u_{t}+\alpha*u_{xxx}+\beta*u*u_{x}=0$
