= Chafee–Infante equation =

Nonlinear partial differential equation

The Chafee–Infante equation is a nonlinear partial differential equation introduced by Nathaniel Chafee and Ettore Infante.

$$u_t-u_{xx}+\lambda(u^3-u)=0$$

It is a special case of the Allen-Cahn equation.

== See also ==
- List of nonlinear partial differential equations
