= Broeren =

Broeren is a surname. Notable people with the surname include:

- Gerben Broeren (born 1972), Dutch track cyclist
- Wayne Broeren (1933–1991), American Paralympic athlete

== See also ==
- Broer
- Broers
- Brogren
