= Bijel =

Mixture of nanoparticles in an emulsion

A bijel (or bicontinuous interfacially jammed emulsion gels) is a structurally stable emulsion generated by jamming nanoparticles at the interface between two (or more) immiscible liquids during spinodal decomposition.
