= List of Dutch loanwords in Indonesian =

The former colonial power, the Netherlands, left an extensive vocabulary. These Dutch loanwords, and loanwords from other European languages which came via Dutch, cover all aspects of life. Some Dutch loanwords, having clusters of several consonants, pose difficulties to speakers of Indonesian. This problem is usually solved by insertion of the schwa. For example, Dutch schroef [ˈsxruf] → sekrup [səˈkrup]. Many Indonesian vocabulary ending "-si" (e.g.:administra-si) also are known from the Dutch vocabulary influence "-tie" (e.g.:administra-tie). All the months from January (Januari) to December (Desember) used in Indonesian are also derived from Dutch. It is estimated that 10,000 words in the Indonesian language can be traced to the Dutch language.

== Examples ==
=== A ===
| Indonesian Word | Indonesian Meaning | Dutch Word | Dutch Meaning | Note | Ref |
|---|---|---|---|---|---|
| abolisi | abolition | abolitie | abolition | | |
| abonemen | subscription | abonnement | subscription | | |
| accoord, akor | agreement, accord | akkoord | agreement, accord | 1. clipped as acc.; 2. Loan word borrowed from French from Vulgar Latin *accordō, accordāre ("to be heart to heart with"), formed from Latin ad + cor ("heart"). | |
| adempauze | breather | adempauze | breather | | |
| administrasi | administration | administratie | administration | | |
| advokat | lawyer | advocaat | lawyer | | |
| afdeling | division, section | afdeling | division, section | | |
| afdeling | division, section | afdeeling | division, section | pre-1934 spelling, obsolete | |
| afspraak | verbal promise | afspraak | arrangement, agreement, understanding | | |
| afdruk | print | afdrukken | | | |
| agen | agent | agent | | | |
| agensi | agency | agentschap | | | |
| Agustus | August | Augustus | August | | |
| aktual | current, present | actueel | current, present | | |
| aliansi | alliance | alliantie | alliance | | |
| ambah | handicraft (archaic) | ambacht | 1. handicraft.; 2. (historical) legal district | | |
| amnesti | amnesty, state-granted pardon | amnestie | amnesty, state-granted pardon | | |
| amprah | demand, request | aanvraag | application | | |
| andil | 1. contribution, part.; 2. (finance) a share, stock | aandeel | 1. contribution, part.; 2. (finance) a share, stock | | |
| jangkar, | anchor | anker | anchor | | |
| antik | antique | antiek | antique | | |
| antre, antri | queue | aantreden | to accept, to join | | |
| antusias | enthusiastic | enthousiast | enthusiastic | | |
| apatis | apathetic | apathisch | apathetic | | |
| apartemen | apartment | appartement | apartment | | |
| apartheid | apartheid | apartheid | 1. separateness, separating characteristics.; 2. apartheid | From Afrikaans, a Dutch-related language, apartheid ("apartheid"). | |
| aplaus | applause | applaus | applause | | |
| apotek, apotik | pharmacy | apotheek | pharmacy | | |
| apoteker | pharmacist | apotheker | pharmacist | | |
| April | April | April | April | | |
| arbéi | strawberry | aardbei | strawberry | | |
| arde | ground (electricity) | aarde | earth, soil, ground | | |
| areal | area | areaal | area | | |
| arloji | watch | horloge | watch | | |
| artikel | article | artikel | article | | |
| arsir | shading | arceren | to highlight, to hatch | | |
| as | axis, axle | as | axis, axle | | |
| asbak | ashtray | asbak | ashtray | From as ("ash") + bak ("container"). | |
| asosial | antisocial | asociaal | antisocial | | |
| atret | backward | achteruit | backward | From achter ("behind") + uit ("out"). | |
| avonturir | adventurer | avonturier | adventurer | | |

=== B ===
| Indonesian Word | Indonesian Meaning | Dutch Word | Dutch Meaning | Note | Ref |
|---|---|---|---|---|---|
| bak | container | bak | container | | |
| ban | tyre, belt | band | tyre, belt | | |
| barikade | barricade | barricades | barricade | | |
| baskom | washbasin | waskom | washbasin | From was ("wash") + kom ("bowel", "basin"). | |
| baterai, batere, baterei | battery | batterij | battery | | |
| baut | bolt | bout | bolt | | |
| bêdindê (dated) | servant | bediende | servant (sing.) | | |
| begroting | budget | begroting | budget | | |
| belek, blek | can, tin | blik | can, tin | | |
| behel | dental braces | beugel | 1. dental braces.; 2. hinged clamp | | |
| beken | famous, notorious | bekend | 1. (well-)known.; 2. familiar, trusted. | | |
| bekleding | upholstering | bekleding | upholstering | | |
| belasting | tax, excise, duty | belasting | 1. strain, burden, load.; 2. tax, levy by public authorities. | | |
| beleid | policy | beleid | 1. policy.; 2. care. | | |
| béngkél | workshop (industrial) | winkel | shop | From Middle Dutch winkel ("corner"). | |
| berurte | fit, stroke or seizure | beroerte | fit, stroke or seizure | | |
| beslit | letter of appointment | besluit | decision, determination | | |
| bêstèl (dated) | delivery place | bestellen | 1. to order, demand delivery.; 2. to deliver | | |
| bestir (dated) | management board | bestuur | 1. management.; 2. governing board.; 3. reign | | |
| bêsèt | excoriation | bezetten | to occupy, to fill | | |
| besuk | to visit sick persons | bezoeken | to visit | | |
| BH, beha | brassiere | bustehouder | brassiere | | |
| binnen | 1. in (preposition, adverb).; 2. set for life | binnen | 1. in (preposition, adverb).; 2. set for life | | |
| bioskop | cinema | bioscoop | cinema | | |
| bistik | beefsteak | biefstuk | beefsteak | | |
| blokir | to block | blokkeer | to block | | |
| bus, bis | bus | bus | bus | | |
| bon | receipt | bon | receipt, ticket (e.g. for speeding), voucher | | |
| boomzaken | harbour administration | boomzaken | harbour administration | | |
| boorwater | boric acid solution | boorwater | boric acid solution | | |
| brankas, brangkas | safe | brandkast | safe | | |
| branwir (dated) | firefighter squad | brandweer | fire department | | |
| bruder | friar (notably Catholic) | broeder | friar (notably Catholic) | 1. cognate with brother in English.; 2. the meaning as brother is dated and translated as broer in Dutch. | |
| buku | book | boek | book | In Indonesian, buku is used for book (for specific for secular books). For religious and poetic book, Indonesian uses kitab (an Arabic loanword) and pustaka (a Sanskrit loanword) respectively. | |
| buncis | green beans | boontjes | beans (plural diminutive) | | |

=== C ===
| Indonesian Word | Indonesian Meaning | Dutch Word | Dutch Meaning | Note | Ref |
|---|---|---|---|---|---|
| cako (dated) | headgear | | | | |
| cokelat | chocolate | chocolade | chocolate | | |
| cultuurstelsel | cultivation system | cultuurstelsel | cultivation system | The Cultivation System was a Dutch government policy in the mid-19th century for its Dutch East Indies colony (now Indonesia). | |
| curatele | guardianship | curatele | guardianship | | |

=== D ===
| Indonesian Word | Indonesian Meaning | Dutch Word | Dutch Meaning | Note | Ref |
|---|---|---|---|---|---|
| dah/dah-dah/dadah | good-bye | dag | (good) day | | |
| dak | roof | dak | | | |
| dasi | necktie | das(je) | | | |
| debat | debate | debat | | | |
| departemèn | department | departement | | | |
| depresi | depression | depressie | | | |
| Désèmber | December | december | | | |
| deterjen | detergent | detergent | | | |
| dinas | administration | dienst | | | |
| diskusi | discussion | discussie | | | |
| dokter | medical doctor | dokter | | | |
| dosis | dose | dosis | | | |
| dus | box | doos | | | |
| duit | money | duit | | a copper Dutch coin | |

=== E ===
| Indonesian Word | Indonesian Meaning | Dutch Word | Dutch Meaning | Note | Ref |
|---|---|---|---|---|---|
| edisi | edition | editie | | | |
| egois | selfish | egoïst | egoist | | |
| émbér | bucket | emmer | | | |
| emosi | emotion | emotie | | | |
| éngsél | hinges | hengsel | | | |
| epidemi | epidemic | epidemie | | | |
| epidemiologi | epidemiology | epidemiologie | | | |
| Eropa | Europe | Europa | | | |
| eksodus | exodus | exodus | | | |
| eksklusif | exclusive | exclusief | | | |
| es | ice | ijs | | | |

=== F ===
| Indonesian Word | Indonesian Meaning | Dutch Word | Dutch Meaning | Note | Ref |
|---|---|---|---|---|---|
| faktur | invoice | factuur | | | |
| fantastis | fantastic | fantastisch | | | |
| Februari | February | februari | | | |
| fisika | physics | fysica | | | |
| fotografer | photographer | fotografer | | | |
| frambus (obsolete) | raspberry | framboos | | | |
| frustasi | frustration | frustratie | | | |

=== G ===
| Indonesian Word | Indonesian Meaning | Dutch Word | Dutch Meaning | Note | Ref |
|---|---|---|---|---|---|
| gaji | wages | gage | collateral | | |
| gang | alley | gang | alley | | |
| gardu | to guard, watch post | garde | guard of honor | | |
| gerilya | guerrilla | guerrilla | guerrilla | | |
| gebuk | to punch | gebukt | to suffer | | |
| gletser | glacier | gletsjer | glacier | | |
| gorden | curtain | gordijn | curtain | | |
| granat | grenade | granaat | gun shell | | |
| gubernur | governor | gouverneur | governor | | |
| gratis | free | gratis | free | | |

=== H ===
| Indonesian Word | Indonesian Meaning | Dutch Word | Dutch Meaning | Note | Ref |
|---|---|---|---|---|---|
| halo | hello | hallo | | | |
| handuk | towel | handdoek | | | |
| hanger | hanger | hanger | | | |
| halte bus | bus stop | bushalte | | | |
| helm | helmet | helm | | | |
| hipotek | mortgage | hypotheek | | | |

=== I ===
| Indonesian Word | Indonesian Meaning | Dutch Word | Dutch Meaning | Note | Ref |
|---|---|---|---|---|---|
| ide | idea | idee | | | |
| identik | identical | identiek | | | |
| ilusi | ilussion | illusie | | | |
| imun | immune | immuun | | | |
| indehoi | fun intimacy / extramarital sex | in het hooi: | in the hay | | |
| Indo | Eurasian, mestizo | | abbreviation of Indo-European | | |
| infanteri | infantry | infanterie | | | |
| insinyur | engineer | ingenieur | | | |
| institut | institute | instituut | | | |
| intim | intimate | intiem | | | |
| iritasi | irritation | irritatie | | | |

=== J ===
| Indonesian Word | Indonesian Meaning | Dutch Word | Dutch Meaning | Note | Ref |
|---|---|---|---|---|---|
| Januari | January | januari | | | |
| jas | coat | jas | | | |
| Juli | July | juli | | | |
| Juni | June | juni | | | |
| jus | juice | jus | gravy | | |

=== K ===
| Indonesian Word | Indonesian Meaning | Dutch Word | Dutch Meaning | Note | Ref |
|---|---|---|---|---|---|
| kabel | cable | kabel | | | |
| kaisar | emperor | keizer | | | |
| kakus | toilet | verb: kakken/noun: kakhuis | | | |
| kalem | calm | kalm | | | |
| kalkun | turkey | kalkoen | | | |
| kamar | room | kamer | | | |
| Kamboja | Cambodia | Cambodja | | | |
| kampanye | campaign | campagne | | | |
| kanker | cancer | kanker | | | |
| kantor | office | kantoor | | | |
| kantor pos | post office | postkantoor | | | |
| karakter | character | karakter | | | |
| karcis | ticket | kaartjes | | plural for diminutive of kaart, card or ticket | |
| karnaval | carnival | carnaval | | | |
| kartu | card | kaart | | | |
| kastanye | chestnut | kastanje | | | |
| katun | cotton | katoen | | | |
| kavaleri | cavalry | cavalerie | | | |
| kavêling | a tract of land | kaveling | | | |
| kelavir | piano | klavier | | | |
| kelar | ready, finished | klaar | | | |
| kelas | class | klas | | | |
| keran | faucet, tap | kraan | | | |
| ketik | to type | getikt | | | |
| knalpot, ""kenalpot"" | muffler (on a motor vehicle) | knalpot | | | |
| kol | cabbages | kool | | | |
| kolega | colleague | collega | | | |
| komandan | commander | commandant | | | |
| komentar | comment | commentaar | | | |
| komersil (replaced by komersial) | commercial | commercieel | | | |
| komisaris | commissioner | commissaris | | | |
| kondisi | condition | conditie | | | |
| kongres | congress | congres | | | |
| kopi | coffee | koffie | | | |
| kopling | clutch | koppeling | | | |
| kopêr | suitcase | koffer | | | |
| kor, ""koor"" | choir | koor | | | |
| koran | newspaper | krant | | | |
| korsleting/konslet | short circuit | kortsluiting | | | |
| korting/diskon | discount | korting/disconteren | | | |
| korup | corrupt | corrupt | | | |
| korupsi | corruption | corruptie | | | |
| kos/indekos | room rental | kost | cost; board | | |
| kroket | croquette | kroket | | | |
| kuitansi | receipt | kwitantie | | | |
| kulkas | ice box or refrigerator | koelkast | | | |
| kursus | course | cursus | | | |
| kusén | window frame | kozijn | | | |
| kusir | coachman | koetsier | | | |

=== L ===
| Indonesian Word | Indonesian Meaning | Dutch Word | Dutch Meaning | Note | Ref |
|---|---|---|---|---|---|
| labil | unstable | labiel | | | |
| laci | deskdrawer | laatje | | diminutive form of la(de) | |
| lampu | lamp | lamp | | | |
| langsam (dated) | slow | langzaam | | | |
| langsir | shunting, switching | rangeren | | | |
| lavendel | lavender | lavendel | | | |
| lem | glue | lijm | | | |
| limun | lemonade | limoen | | | |
| lisensi | license | licentie | | | |
| listrik | electric | elektrisch | | | |
| loket | pay box | loket | | | |

=== M ===
| Indonesian Word | Indonesian Meaning | Dutch Word | Dutch Meaning | Note | Ref |
|---|---|---|---|---|---|
| makelar | broker | makelaar | | | |
| mantel | coat | mantel | | | |
| Maret | March | maart | | | |
| maskapai | company, especially airline | maatschappij | company | | |
| masker | face mask | gezichtsmasker | | | |
| massa | mass (bulk, load) | massa | | | |
| matras | bed | matras | | | |
| mébêl | furniture | meubel | | | |
| media massa | mass media | massamedia | | | |
| Mei | May | mei | | | |
| meises | sprinkles | muisjes | | | |
| merek | brand | merk | | | |
| mesin | machine, engine | machine | | | |
| migrasi | migration | migratie | | | |
| miliar | billion | miljard | | | |
| minder | not confident | minder | | | |
| misi | mission | missie | | | |
| mobil | car, automobile | automobiel | | | |
| montir | mechanic | monteur | | | |
| motor | motorcycle | motorfiets | | | |
| mur | nut (hardware) | moer | nut (hardware) | | |

=== N ===
| Indonesian Word | Indonesian Meaning | Dutch Word | Dutch Meaning | Note | Ref |
|---|---|---|---|---|---|
| nanas | pineapple | ananas | | Portuguese: Ananas, origin South America | |
| nomor | number | nummer | | | |
| nol | zero/nil | nul | | | |
| November | November | november | | | |

=== O ===
| Indonesian Word | Indonesian Meaning | Dutch Word | Dutch Meaning | Note | Ref |
|---|---|---|---|---|---|
| observasi | observation | observatie | | | |
| Oktober | October | oktober | | | |
| Olibolen | Oliebol | oliebollen | | | |
| om | uncle | oom | | | |
| oma | grandma | oma | | | |
| omzet, ""omset"" | revenue | omzet | | | |
| onderdil | components/spare parts | onderdeel | | | |
| ongkos | cost & expenses | onkosten | | | |
| opa | granddad | opa | | | |
| oranyê | orange (colour) | oranje | | | |
| orgêl | pipe organ | orgel | | | |
| otomatis | automatic | automatisch | | | |

=== P ===
| Indonesian Word | Indonesian Meaning | Dutch Word | Dutch Meaning | Note | Ref |
|---|---|---|---|---|---|
| pabrik | factory | fabriek | | | |
| pandemi | pandemic | pandemie | | | |
| panik | panic | paniek | | | |
| panêkuk | pancake | pannenkoek | | | |
| parkir | parking | parkeer | | | |
| parlemen | parliament | parlement | | | |
| paroki | parish | parochie | | | |
| pas | fit | past | | from the third person singular of "passen" | |
| pastor | pastor | pastoor | | | |
| paus | pope | paus | | | |
| paviliun | pavilion | paviljoen | | | |
| pelek, ""velg"" | rim | velg | | | |
| pelopor | frontrunner | voorloper | | | |
| pénsil | pencil | penseel | brush | | |
| pensiun | retirement | pensioen | | | |
| perboden, ""verboden"" | prohibit (mainly used in street signs in Indonesian) | verboden | | | |
| permak, ""vermak"" | alter (clothes), transform | vermaken (kleding) | | | |
| permisi | excuse me; permission | permissie | permission | | |
| peron | platform (railway) | perron | | | |
| pers | press | pers | | | |
| persik | peach | perzik | | | |
| persis | precise, exactly the same, look alike | precies | | | |
| persneling | gear | versnelling | | | |
| plafon | ceiling | plafond | | The Dutch word is from French | |
| pofercis | poffertjes | poffertjes | | | |
| polisi | police | politie | | | |
| pos | post | post | | | |
| potlot (dated or obsolete | pencil | potlood | | | |
| potret | portrait | portret | | | |
| prahoto (obsolete) | truck | vrachtauto | | | |
| preman | gangster | vrijman | freeman; outlaw | | |
| prestasi | performance | prestatie | | | |
| prinsip | principle | principe | | | |
| proyek | project | project | | | |
| puisi | poetry | poëzie | | | |

=== R ===
| Indonesian Word | Indonesian Meaning | Dutch Word | Dutch Meaning | Note | Ref |
|---|---|---|---|---|---|
| redaksi | editorial office | redactie | | | |
| referensi | reference | referentie | | | |
| rekening | account | rekening | | | |
| reklame | advertisement | reclame | | | |
| rem | brake | rem | | | |
| republik | republic | republiek | | | |
| rentenir | loan shark | rentenier | person of independent means; from "rente", meaning interest on capital | | |
| resep | recipe | recept | | | |
| ritsleting, ""resleting"" | zipper | ritssluiting | | | |
| risiko | risk | risico | | | |
| rok | skirt | rok | | | |
| rokok | cigarette; smoke | roken | to smoke | | |

=== S ===
| Indonesian Word | Indonesian Meaning | Dutch Word | Dutch Meaning | Note | Ref |
|---|---|---|---|---|---|
| sakelar | switch | schakelaar | switch | | |
| saldo | balance | saldo | balance | | |
| sampanye | champagne | champagne | champagne | | |
| satelit | satellite | satelliet | satellite | | |
| saus | sauce | saus | sauce | | |
| segel | seal | zegel | seal | | |
| sekop | shovel | schop | shovel | | |
| sekrup | screw | schroef | screw | | |
| seks | sex | seks | sex | | |
| seksi | section | sectie | section | | |
| selang | water hose | slang | hose | | |
| sempak | swim briefs | zwempak | swimsuit | | |
| senewen | jumpy | zenuwachtig | nervous | | |
| September | September | september | September | | |
| sepur | railway track | spoor | track | | |
| serius | serious | serieus | serious | | |
| sertifikat | certificate | certificaat | certificate | | |
| setrap | sanction | straf | penalty | | |
| setrika | clothes iron | strijkijzer | clothes iron | | |
| setrum | current (electricity) | stroom | current (electricity) | | |
| setrupwafel | stroopwafel | stroopwafel | syrup waffle | | |
| sinkron | sync | synchroon | in sync | | |
| sinkronisasi | synchronization | synchronisatie | synchronization | | |
| sinterklas | Santa Claus | sinterklaas | Saint Nicholas | | |
| sipir | warden | cipier | warden | | |
| sirkulasi | circulation | circulatie | circulation | | |
| sirsak | soursop | zuurzak | soursop | | |
| skakmat | checkmate | schaakmat | checkmate | | |
| solusi | solution | solutie | (chemistry) solution | | |
| sopir | chauffeur (driver) | chauffeur | chauffeur (driver) | | |
| sosis | sausage | saucijs | sausage | | |
| spanduk | commercial or information banner | spandoek | banner | | |
| spekuk | spekkoek or thousand layer cake | spekkoek | bacon cake | | |
| standar | standard | standaard | standard | | |
| stasiun | train station | station | station | | |
| stopkontak | power socket | stopcontact | power socket | | |
| struktur | structure | structuur | structure | | |
| sun | kiss | zoen | kiss | | |
| suster | nun, nurse, sister | zuster | nun, nurse, sister | | |

=== T ===
| Indonesian Word | Indonesian Meaning | Dutch Word | Dutch Meaning | Note | Ref |
|---|---|---|---|---|---|
| tang | pliers | tang | | | |
| tas | bag | tas | | | |
| tangki | tank | tankje | | The Dutch word is a diminutive of tank | |
| tégel | floor tile | tegel | | | |
| teh | tea | thee | | | |
| téken | sign (on signature) | teken | | | |
| teknologi | technology | technologie | | | |
| telat | late | te laat | too late | | |
| telefon | telephone | telefoon | | | |
| televisi | television | televisie | | | |
| tema | theme | thema | | | |
| terompet | trumpet | trompet | | | |
| teori | theory | theorie | | | |
| tinta | ink | tint | | | |
| tomat | tomato | tomaat | | Portuguese: tomate, origin Central America | |
| topik | topic | topic | | | |
| toren | tower (usually for water tower in Indonesian) | toren | | | |
| traktir | treat | trakteer | | | |
| trotoar | sidewalk | trottoir | sidewalk, footpath | French: trottoir | |
| tuslah | additional cost or surcharge | toeslag | allowance | | |
| tustel | camera tools (dated) | toestel | device, appliances | | |

=== V ===
| Indonesian Word | Indonesian Meaning | Dutch Word | Dutch Meaning | Note | Ref |
|---|---|---|---|---|---|
| variabel | variable | variabel | | | |
| vas | vase | vaas | | | |
| versi | version | versie | | | |
| visi | vision | visie | | | |
| voorijder | outrider | voorrijder | | | |
| vulkan | volcano | vulkaan | | | |

=== W ===
| Indonesian Word | Indonesian Meaning | Dutch Word | Dutch Meaning | Note | Ref |
|---|---|---|---|---|---|
| wastafel | sink | wastafel | | | |
| WC | lavatory | WC | | | |
| wol | wool | wol | | | |
| wortel | carrot | wortel | | | |

=== Y ===
| Indonesian Word | Indonesian Meaning | Dutch Word | Dutch Meaning | Note | Ref |
|---|---|---|---|---|---|
| yodium | iodine | jodium | | | |
| yuridis | juridical | juridisch | | | |
| yustisi | judiciary | justitie | | | |
