= Porous medium equation =

Nonlinear partial differential equation

The porous medium equation, also called the nonlinear heat equation, is a nonlinear partial differential equation taking the form:

$\frac{\partial u}{\partial t} = \Delta \left(u^{m}\right), \quad m > 1$

where $\Delta$ is the Laplace operator. It may also be put into its equivalent divergence form:
$${\partial u\over{\partial t}} = \nabla \cdot \left[ D(u)\nabla u \right]$$
where $D(u) = mu^{m-1}$ may be interpreted as a diffusion coefficient and $\nabla\cdot(\cdot)$ is the divergence operator.

== Solutions ==
Despite being a nonlinear equation, the porous medium equation may be solved exactly using separation of variables or a similarity solution. However, the separation of variables solution is known to blow up to infinity at a finite time.

=== Barenblatt-Kompaneets-Zeldovich similarity solution ===
The similarity approach to solving the porous medium equation was taken by Barenblatt and Kompaneets/Zeldovich, which for $x \in \mathbb{R}^{n}$ was to find a solution satisfying:
$$u(t,x) = {1\over{t^{\alpha}}}v\left( {x\over{t^{\beta}}} \right), \quad t > 0$$
for some unknown function $v$ and unknown constants $\alpha,\beta$. The final solution to the porous medium equation under these scalings is:
$$u(t,x) = {1\over{t^{\alpha}}}\left( b - {m-1\over{2m}} \beta {\|x\|^{2}\over{t^{2\beta}}} \right)_{+}^{1\over{m-1}}$$
where $\|\cdot\|^{2}$ is the $\ell^{2}$-norm, $(\cdot)_{+}$ is the positive part, and the coefficients are given by:
$$\alpha = {n\over{n(m-1) + 2}}, \quad \beta = {1\over{n(m-1) + 2}}$$

== Applications ==
The porous medium equation has been found to have a number of applications in gas flow, heat transfer, and groundwater flow.

=== Gas flow ===
The porous medium equation name originates from its use in describing the flow of an ideal gas in a homogeneous porous medium. We require three equations to completely specify the medium's density $\rho$, flow velocity field ${\bf v}$, and pressure $p$: the continuity equation for conservation of mass; Darcy's law for flow in a porous medium; and the ideal gas equation of state. These equations are summarized below:
$$\begin{aligned}
\varepsilon {\partial \rho\over{\partial t}} &= -\nabla \cdot (\rho {\bf v}) & (\text{Conservation of mass}) \\
{\bf v} &= -{k\over{\mu}}\nabla p & (\text{Darcy's law}) \\
p &= p_{0}\rho^{\gamma} & (\text{Equation of state})
\end{aligned}$$
where $\varepsilon$ is the porosity, $k$ is the permeability of the medium, $\mu$ is the dynamic viscosity, and $\gamma$ is the polytropic exponent (equal to the heat capacity ratio for isentropic processes). Assuming constant porosity, permeability, and dynamic viscosity, the partial differential equation for the density is:
$${\partial \rho\over{\partial t}} = c\Delta \left( \rho^{m} \right)$$
where $m = \gamma + 1$ and $c = \gamma k p_{0}/(\gamma+1)\varepsilon\mu$.

=== Heat transfer ===
Using Fourier's law of heat conduction, the general equation for temperature change in a medium through conduction is:
$$\rho c_{p} {\partial T\over{\partial t}} = \nabla \cdot (\kappa \nabla T)$$
where $\rho$ is the medium's density, $c_{p}$ is the specific heat capacity at constant pressure, and $\kappa$ is the thermal conductivity. If the thermal conductivity depends on temperature according to the power law:
$$\kappa = \alpha T^{n}$$
Then the heat transfer equation may be written as the porous medium equation:
$${\partial T\over{\partial t}} = \lambda\Delta \left(T^{m}\right)$$
with $m=n+1$ and $\lambda = \alpha/\rho c_{p}m$. The thermal conductivity of high-temperature plasmas seems to follow a power law.

== See also ==
- Diffusion equation
- Porous medium
