= Allen–Cahn equation =

Equation in mathematical physics

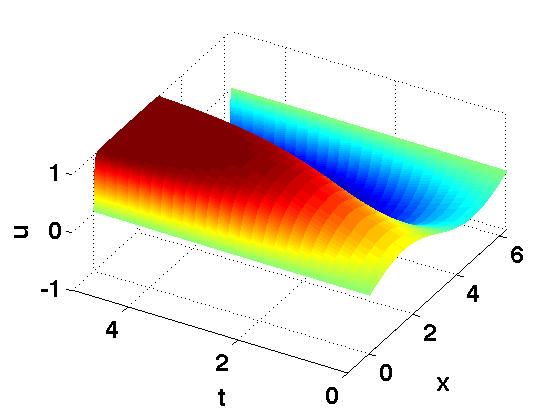
A numerical solution to the one dimensional Allen–Cahn equation

The Allen–Cahn equation (after John W. Cahn and Sam Allen) is a reaction–diffusion equation of mathematical physics which describes the process of phase separation in multi-component alloy systems, including order-disorder transitions.

The equation describes the time evolution of a scalar-valued state variable $\eta$ on a domain $\Omega$ during a time interval $\mathcal{T}$, and is given by:

$$\begin{align}
{{\partial \eta}\over{\partial t}}= {} & M_\eta[\operatorname{div}(\varepsilon^2_\eta \, \nabla\,\eta)-f'(\eta)]\quad \text{on } \Omega\times\mathcal{T},
\quad \eta=\bar\eta\quad\text{on }\partial_\eta\Omega\times\mathcal{T}, \\[5pt]
&  {-(\varepsilon^2_\eta \, \nabla\,\eta)} \cdot m = q\quad\text{on } \partial_q \Omega \times \mathcal{T},
\quad \eta=\eta_o \quad\text{on } \Omega\times\{0\},
\end{align}$$

where $M_\eta$ is the mobility, $f$ is a double-well potential, $\bar\eta$ is the control on the state variable at the portion of the boundary $\partial_\eta\Omega$, $q$ is the source control at $\partial_q\Omega$, $\eta_o$ is the initial condition, and $m$ is the outward normal to $\partial\Omega$.

It is the L^{2} gradient flow of the Ginzburg–Landau free energy functional. It is closely related to the Cahn–Hilliard equation. A simplified one-dimensional version of the equation, using $f(\eta)=\frac{1}{4}(1-\eta^2)^2$ , is known as the Chafee-Infante equation.

== Mathematical description ==
Let

- $\Omega\subset \R^n$ be an open set,
- $v_0(x)\in L^2(\Omega)$ an arbitrary initial function,
- $\varepsilon>0$ and $T>0$ two constants.

A function $v(x,t):\Omega\times [0,T]\to \R$ is a solution to the Allen–Cahn equation if it solves

$$\partial_t v-\Delta_x v = -\frac{1}{\varepsilon^2}f(v),\quad \Omega \times[0,T]$$

where

- $\Delta_x$ is the Laplacian with respect to the space $x$,
- $f(v)=F'(v)$ is the derivative of a non-negative $F\in C^1(\R)$ with two minima $F(\pm 1)=0$.

Usually, one has the following initial condition with the Neumann boundary condition

$$\begin{cases}
v(x,0) = v_0(x), & \Omega \times \{0\}\\
\partial_n v = 0, & \partial \Omega \times [0,T]\\
\end{cases}$$

where $\partial_n v$ is the outer normal derivative.

For $F(v)$ one popular candidate is

$$F(v)=\frac{(v^2-1)^2}{4},\qquad f(v)=v^3-v.$$
