= Estevez–Mansfield–Clarkson equation =

In mathematics, the Estevez–Mansfield–Clarkson equation is the following nonlinear partial differential equation:

$$U_{tyyy}+\beta U_y U_{yt}+\beta U_{yy} U_t+U_{tt}=0$$,

where $U=U(x,y,t).$ It was introduced by Pilar Estevez, Elizabeth Mansfield, and Peter Clarkson.
