= Bert Broer =

Dutch mathematician (1916–1991)

L. J. F. Broer
- Born: 17 January 1916; Dordrecht, Netherlands
- Died: 1991 (aged 74–75); Netherlands
- Education: University of Amsterdam
- Known for: Nonlinear partial differential equations; Broer–Kaup equations
- Scientific career
- Fields: Physicist, mathematician
- Workplaces: Eindhoven University of Technology
- Doctoral advisor: C. J. Gorter, J. D. van der Waals Jr.

Lambertus Johannes Folkert "Bert" Broer (17 January 1916 – 1991) was a Dutch physicist and mathematician.
