= Ernst equation =

Equation used in general relativity

In general relativity, the Ernst equation is an integrable non-linear partial differential equation, named after the American physicist Frederick J. Ernst who published it in 1968.

== Description ==
The Ernst's equation governing the complex scalar function $Z$ is given by

$$\Re(Z)\nabla^2 Z = \nabla Z \cdot \nabla Z$$

where $\nabla$ is the two-dimensional gradient operator with axisymmetry; for instance, if $Z=Z(\rho,z)$, then

$$\Re(Z)\left[\frac{1}{\rho}\frac{\partial }{\partial\rho}\left(\rho\frac{\partial Z}{\partial\rho}\right)+ \frac{\partial^2 Z}{\partial^2 z}\right] = \left(\frac{\partial Z}{\partial \rho}\right)^2 + \left(\frac{\partial Z}{\partial z}\right)^2.$$

and if $Z=Z(t,\rho)$ (with $c=1$), then

$$\Re(Z)\left[ \frac{\partial^2 Z}{\partial^2 t}-\frac{1}{\rho}\frac{\partial }{\partial\rho}\left(\rho\frac{\partial Z}{\partial\rho}\right)\right] = \left(\frac{\partial Z}{\partial t}\right)^2 + \left(\frac{\partial Z}{\partial \rho}\right)^2.$$

where $\Re(Z)$ is the real part of $Z$. If $Z$ is a solution of the Ernst's equation, then $Z/(1+icZ)$ (so is $Z^{-1}$) is also a solution where $c$ is an arbitrary real constant. The transformation $Z\to Z/(1+icZ)$ belongs to the so-called Ehlers transformation.

Often, one introduces

$$Z = -\frac{1+E}{1-E}$$

so that we have

$$(1-|E|^2) \nabla^2 E = - 2 E^* \nabla E\cdot \nabla E.$$

The Ernst equation is derivable from the Lagrangian density

$$\mathcal{L}=\frac{\nabla Z\cdot \nabla Z}{\Re(Z)^2}=\frac{\nabla E\cdot \nabla E^*}{(1-|E|)^2}.$$

For its Lax pair and other features see e.g. and references therein.

== Usage ==
The Ernst equation is employed in order to produce exact solutions of the Einstein's equations in the general theory of relativity.
