= Elizabeth Mansfield (mathematician) =

Australian mathematician

Elizabeth Louise Mansfield FIMA is an Australian mathematician whose research includes the study of moving frames and conservation laws for discretisations of physical systems. She is a Fellow of the Institute of Mathematics and its Applications and was a Vice-President thereof from January 2015 until December 2018. She was the first female full professor of mathematics at the University of Kent. She was one of the co-editors of the LMS Journal of Computation and Mathematics, a journal published by the London Mathematical Society from 1998 to 2015. She is on the Editorial Board of the Journal of the Foundations of Computational Mathematics.

Mansfield obtained her Ph.D. from the University of Sydney in 1992. Her dissertation, Differential Gröbner Bases, was supervised by Edward Douglas Fackerell. At the University of Kent, she is a professor in the School of Mathematics, Statistics and Actuarial Science.

Mansfield is one of the people the Estevez–Mansfield–Clarkson equation was named for. She is the author of a book on the method of moving frames, A Practical Guide to the Invariant Calculus (Cambridge Monographs on Applied and Computational Mathematics 26, Cambridge University Press, 2010). In 2018, she organized the Noether Celebration in London, a conference concerning the works of Emmy Noether, whom Mansfield cites as an inspiration for her own work.
