= Broer =

Broer is a surname. Notable people with the surname include:

- Bert Broer (1916–1991), Dutch physicist and mathematician
- Henk Broer (born 1950), Dutch mathematician
- Jan-Martin Bröer (born 1982), German rower

== See also ==
- Broeren
- Broers
