= John W. Cahn =

American scientist (1928–2016)

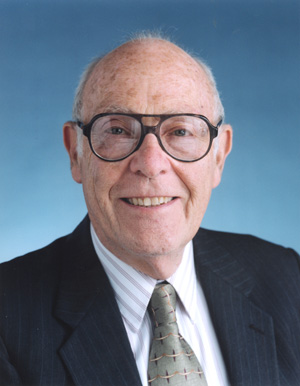
- John W. Cahn
- Born: Hans Werner Cahn; January 9, 1928; Cologne, Prussia
- Died: March 14, 2016 (aged 88); Seattle, Washington
- Education: University of Michigan; University of California at Berkeley
- Known for: Allen–Cahn equation, Cahn–Hilliard equation
- Spouse: Anne Hessing Cahn
- Scientific career
- Fields: Metallurgy
- Workplaces: Massachusetts Institute of Technology; National Institute of Standards and Technology
- Doctoral advisor: Richard Edward Powell

John Werner Cahn (January 9, 1928 – March 14, 2016) was an American scientist and recipient of the 1998 National Medal of Science. Born in Cologne, Weimar Germany, he was a professor in the department of metallurgy at the Massachusetts Institute of Technology (MIT) from 1964 to 1978. From 1977, he held a position at the National Institute of Standards and Technology (formerly the National Bureau of Standards). Cahn had a profound influence on the course of materials research during his career. One of the foremost authorities on thermodynamics, Cahn applied the basic laws of thermodynamics to describe and predict a wide range of physical phenomena.

== Biography ==
Hans Werner Cahn was born in Cologne, Germany, to a Jewish family. His father was an anti-Nazi lawyer and his mother an X-ray technician.

After the Machtergreifung in 1933, the elder Cahn escaped arrest only because he had been forewarned by a fellow lawyer. The family fled Germany and eventually ended up in Amsterdam. They immigrated to America in 1939, where Hans became John. Most of his family back in Europe was murdered in the Holocaust.

The Cahns settled in New York City. John Cahn became an American citizen in 1945. Serving in the United States Army, he was stationed in Japan during its occupation by the Allies.

Cahn received a bachelor's degree in chemistry in 1949 from the University of Michigan. He later earned a Ph.D in physical chemistry in 1953 from the University of California at Berkeley. His doctoral thesis was titled "The Oxidation of Isotopically Labelled Hydrazine" and his thesis advisor was R. E. Powell.

In 1954, Cahn joined the chemical metallurgy research effort at the General Electric laboratory in Schenectady, New York, led by David Turnbull. Turnbull had done pioneering work on the kinetics of nucleation, and there was a focus in the group on understanding the thermodynamics and kinetics of phase transformations in solids.

In 1964, Cahn became a professor in the Department of Metallurgy (now Materials Science) at the Massachusetts Institute of Technology. He left MIT in 1978. In 1969, Cahn began a long professional relationship with his graduate student, Francis Larché, whose work focussed on the effect of mechanical stress on the thermodynamics of solids. The Larche–Cahn approach is the cornerstone of the treatment of the thermodynamics of stressed materials. Good examples of this phenomenon are the regions near a coherent precipitate or the stress field around a dislocation.

In 1972, Cahn worked with David W. Hoffman to formulate vector-based thermodynamics to describe the thermodynamics of interfaces, a formulation which is necessary to account for anisotropic materials. This is also known as the capillary vector formulation of interface energies. The mathematics of this treatment involves the concept of norms, although Cahn and Hoffman were unaware of it at the time.

In 1975, Cahn worked with his graduate student Sam Allen on phase transitions in iron alloys, including order-disorder transitions. This work led to the Allen–Cahn equation.

From 1984, he was an affiliate professor at the University of Washington.

== Work ==
Microstructural evolution under the Cahn–Hilliard equation, demonstrating distinctive coarsening and phase separation.

=== The spinodal ===
In 1957, Cahn worked with John E. Hilliard to develop the Cahn–Hilliard equation which describes the thermodynamic forces driving phase separation in many systems, and developed the joint theory of spinodal decomposition.

=== Solidification ===
In the theory of crystal growth, Cahn concluded that the distinguishing feature is the ability of the surface to reach an equilibrium state in the presence of a thermodynamic driving force (typically in the form of the degree of undercooling). He also concluded that for every surface or interface in a crystalline medium, there exists a critical driving force, which, if exceeded, will enable the surface or interface to advance normal to itself, and, if not exceeded, will require the lateral growth mechanism.

Thus, for sufficiently large driving forces, the interface can move uniformly without the benefit of either a heterogeneous nucleation or screw dislocation mechanism. What constitutes a sufficiently large driving force depends upon the diffuseness of the interface, so that for extremely diffuse interfaces, this critical driving force will be so small that any measurable driving force will exceed it. Alternatively, for sharp interfaces, the critical driving force will be very large, and most growth will occur by the lateral step mechanism.

=== Droplets and surfaces ===
In 1977, Cahn published a simple mathematical treatment of the thermodynamics of wetting: the interaction between a liquid in contact with a solid surface. This paper laid out a simple formulation for describing the wetting transition—the point at which a liquid changes from forming a droplet on a surface to spreading out evenly as a liquid film over the surface. This theory had wide-ranging implications for many materials processing techniques.

=== Quasicrystals ===
In 1982, Dan Shechtman observed a new crystalline structure with puzzling features. Cahn contributed to the theory of how such a structure could be thermodynamically stable and became co-author of the seminal paper which introduced quasicrystals.

=== Glass transition ===
In 2004, Cahn and Bendersky presented evidence that an "isotropic non-crystalline metallic phase" (dubbed "q-glass") can be grown from the melt. This is the "primary phase," to form in the Al-Fe-Si system during rapid cooling. Experimental evidence indicates that this phase forms by a first-order transition. TEM images show that the q-glass nucleates from the melt as discrete particles, which grow spherically with a uniform growth rate in all directions. The diffraction pattern shows it to be an isotropic glassy phase. Yet there is a nucleation barrier, which implies an interfacial discontinuity (or internal surface) between the glass and the melt.

== Research in retirement ==
In his retirement, Cahn accepted a position at the University of Washington as an affiliate professor in the Departments of Materials Science and Engineering and Physics.

== Personal life ==
He had three children and six grandsons. In retirement, he lived in Seattle, Washington, with his wife, Anne Hessing Cahn. He died from leukemia in Seattle on March 14, 2016.

== Honors and awards ==
2011 The Kyoto Prize, Inamori Foundation

2002 Bower Prize, Franklin Institute

2001 Emil Heyn Medal, German Metallurgical Society

2001 Honorary Life Member, American Ceramic Society

1999 Bakhuys Roozeboon Lecturer and Gold medal, Netherlands Academy of Sciences

1998 National Medal of Science

1998 Member, National Academy of Engineering

1998 Distinguished GE Lecturer in Materials Science at RPI

'69 & `98 MacDonald Lecturer, Canadian Metallurgical Society

1996 Doctor Honoris Causis, Universite d'Évry, France

1995 Harvey Prize, Technion.

1994 Rockwell Medal; Hall of Fame for Engineering, Science and Technology, and Medal, International Technology Institute.

1994 Gold Medal, Honorary Member, Japan Institute of Metals.

1993 Inland Steel Lecture, Northwestern University.

1993 Hume–Rothery Award, TMS.

1993 Cyril Stanley Smith Lecturer, University of Chicago.

1992 Honorary member, MRS-India.

1991 Michelson–Morley Award, Case Western University.

1990 Honorary Sc. D., Northwestern University; Hilliard Lecturer.

1989 Sauveur Award, ASM International.

1987 Distinguished Physics Lecturer, Boston University.

1986 Stratton Award, National Bureau of Standards.

1985 Von Hippel Award, Materials Research Society.

1984 Gold Medal, US Department of Commerce.

1983 Distinguished Lecturer, University of Connecticut.

1982 Golick Lecturer, University of Missouri, Rolla, MO.

1981 Fellow, Japan Society for the Promotion of Science.

1981 Dickson Prize, Carnegie–Mellon University.

1980 Honorary Professor, Jiao Tong University, Shanghai, China.

1979 Van Horn Lecturer, Case-Western University.

1978 Dorn Lecturer, Northwestern University.

1977 Acta Metallurgica Gold Medal.

1974 Fellow, American Academy of Arts and Sciences.

1973 Member, National Academy of Sciences.

1968 Institute of Metals Lecturer, AIME.

1966 S. B. Meyer Award, American Ceramic Society.

1960–61 Guggenheim Fellowship spent at the University of Cambridge, Goldsmith Laboratory.

1951 Allied Chemical and Dye Fellowship at University of California, Berkeley.
