= Broers (band) =

South African music group

Broers (Die Broers)
- Origin: South Africa
- Genres: Pop
- Years active: 2006-present (group); 1993-2007 (duo Christo en Cobus)
- Label: SMP
- Members: Christo Snyman; Cobus Snyman; Stephan Snyman

Broers or alternatively Die Broers is a South African music group trio made up of Snyman brother Christo, Cobus and Stephan and formed in 2006. Broers (meaning Brothers in Afrikaans) had a big hit with "Huistoe" (meaning Home in Afrikaans) in 2008 for which they won "Best Song of the Year" in the Tempo Awards given annually by Huisgenoot popular Afrikaans magazine in South Africa. Their live DVD Broers Tussen die Sterre (meaning Brothers Between the Stars) was nominated for the category "Best DVD of the Year". The band has its own publishing company SMP (Snyman-musiekproduksies).

== Christo en Cobus ==
Prior to Broers, the older brothers had worked independently as a duo under the name Christo en Cobus starting 1992. The last release as a duo was in 2007 after which they concentrated on the Broers with four studio albums including a gospel album.

== Nic Stevens ==
Meanwhile, the youngest brother Stephan Snyman had been developing a music career on his own using the name Nic Stevens. Stephan is also a multi-instrumentalist playing the piano, guitar and the trumpet. He has three albums to his name including a full album of cover of Bryan Adams songs.

== Discography ==
=== Christo en Cobus ===
Studio albums

- 1993: Prince of Romance (SMP)
- 1995: Somernag - Sterrenag (Mac Villa)
- 1997: Kyk Hoe Lyk Ons Nou (BMG/ Mac Villa)
- 1998: Dancing to The Beat of Our Music (BMG/ Mac Villa)
- 2000: Nuwe Winde (Maroela Musiek)
- 2002: Trein Na Margate (SMP)
- 2007: 7x70 (SMP)
- 2011: 20 Partytjie Treffers (SMP)

Compilation albums

- 2000: Tiekiedraai deur die eeu (2 CDs) (BMG/ Mac Villa)

=== Christo Snyman ===
Studio albums

- 2003: 3 Chord Love Songs (SMP)

=== Cobus Snyman ===
Studio albums

- 2003: Live, Laugh, Love Country (SMP)
- 2013: Cowboys & Crooks (SMP)

=== Nic Stevens ===
Studio albums

- 2004: Jonk Bly (SMP)
- 2007: Toeter Skoeter (SMP)
- 2011: Sing Die Musiek Van Bryan Adams (SMP)

=== Broers ===
Studio albums

- 2006: Broers (SMP)
- 2009: 10 000 Myl (SMP)
- 2011: Voetspore (SMP) (gospel album)
- 2013: Voetspore 2 (SMP) (gospel album)

Live albums

- 2010: Grootste Treffers Live (SMP)

DVDs

- 2006: Tussen Die Sterre (SMP / Select Music)
- 2010: 10 000 Myl DVD (SMP / Select Music)
- 2012: Voetspore (SMP) (a gospel DVD)
