= Spinodal decomposition =

Mechanism of spontaneous phase separation

Microstructural evolution under the Cahn–Hilliard equation, demonstrating distinctive coarsening and phase separation.

Spinodal decomposition is a mechanism by which a single thermodynamic phase spontaneously separates into two phases (without nucleation). Decomposition occurs when there is no thermodynamic barrier to phase separation. As a result, phase separation via decomposition does not require the nucleation events resulting from thermodynamic fluctuations, which normally trigger phase separation.

Spinodal decomposition is observed when mixtures of metals or polymers separate into two co-existing phases, each rich in one species and poor in the other. When the two phases emerge in approximately equal proportion (each occupying about the same volume or area), characteristic intertwined structures are formed that gradually coarsen (see animation). The dynamics of spinodal decomposition is commonly modeled using the Cahn–Hilliard equation.

Spinodal decomposition is fundamentally different from nucleation and growth. When there is a nucleation barrier to the formation of a second phase, time is taken by the system to overcome that barrier. As there is no barrier (by definition) to spinodal decomposition, some fluctuations (in the order parameter that characterizes the phase) start growing instantly. Furthermore, in spinodal decomposition, the two distinct phases start growing in any location uniformly throughout the volume, whereas a nucleated phase change begins at a discrete number of points.

Spinodal decomposition occurs when a homogenous phase becomes thermodynamically unstable. An unstable phase lies at a maximum in free energy. In contrast, nucleation and growth occur when a homogenous phase becomes metastable. That is, another biphasic system becomes lower in free energy, but the homogenous phase remains at a local minimum in free energy, and so is resistant to small fluctuations. J. Willard Gibbs described two criteria for a metastable phase: that it must remain stable against a small change over a large area.

== History ==
In the early 1940s, Bradley reported the observation of sidebands around the Bragg peaks in the X-ray diffraction pattern of a Cu-Ni-Fe alloy that had been quenched and then annealed inside the miscibility gap. Further observations on the same alloy were made by Daniel and Lipson, who demonstrated that the sidebands could be explained by a periodic modulation of composition in the <100> directions. From the spacing of the sidebands, they were able to determine the wavelength of the modulation, which was of the order of 100 angstroms (10 nm).

The growth of a composition modulation in an initially homogeneous alloy implies uphill diffusion or a negative diffusion coefficient. Becker and Dehlinger had already predicted a negative diffusivity inside the spinodal region of a binary system, but their treatments could not account for the growth of a modulation of a particular wavelength, such as was observed in the Cu-Ni-Fe alloy. In fact, any model based on Fick's law yields a physically unacceptable solution when the diffusion coefficient is negative.

The first explanation of the periodicity was given by Mats Hillert in his 1955 Doctoral Dissertation at MIT. Starting with a regular solution model, he derived a flux equation for one-dimensional diffusion on a discrete lattice. This equation differed from the usual one by the inclusion of a term, which allowed for the effect of the interfacial energy on the driving force of adjacent interatomic planes that differed in composition. Hillert solved the flux equation numerically and found that inside the spinodal it yielded a periodic variation of composition with distance. Furthermore, the wavelength of the modulation was of the same order as that observed in the Cu-Ni-Fe alloys.

Building on Hillert's work, a more flexible continuum model was subsequently developed by John W. Cahn and John Hilliard, who included the effects of coherency strains as well as the gradient energy term. The strains are significant in that they dictate the ultimate morphology of the decomposition in anisotropic materials.

== Cahn–Hilliard model for spinodal decomposition ==
Free energies in the presence of small amplitude fluctuations, e.g. in concentration, can be evaluated using an approximation introduced by Ginzburg and Landau to describe magnetic field gradients in superconductors. This approach allows one to approximate the free energy as an expansion in terms of the concentration gradient $\nabla c$, a vector. Since free energy is a scalar and we are probing near its minima, the term proportional to $\nabla c$ is negligible. The lowest order term is the quadratic expression $\kappa(\nabla c)^2$, a scalar. Here $\kappa$ is a parameter that controls the free energy cost of variations in concentration $c$.

The Cahn–Hilliard free energy is then

$$F = \int_v [ f_b + \kappa( \nabla c)^2 ]~dV$$

where $f_b$ is the bulk free energy per unit volume of the homogeneous solution, and the integral is over the volume of the system.

We now want to study the stability of the system with respect to small fluctuations in the concentration $c$, for example a sine wave of amplitude $a$ and wavevector $q=2\pi/\lambda$, for $\lambda$ the wavelength of the concentration wave. To be thermodynamically stable, the free energy change $\delta F$ due to any small amplitude concentration fluctuation $\delta c=a\sin({\vec q}.{\vec r})$, must be positive.

We may expand $f_b$ about the average composition c_{o} as follows:

$$f_b( c ) = f_b( c_0 )+
\left( c - c_0 \right) \left( \frac{\partial f}{\partial c} \right)_{c\,=\,c_0}
+     \frac{1}{2}\, \left( c - c_0 \right)^2 \left( \frac{\partial^2 f}{\partial c^2} \right)_{c\,=\,c_0} +\cdots$$

and for the perturbation $\delta c=a\sin({\vec q}.{\vec r})$ the free energy change is

$$f_b + \kappa( \nabla c)^2 = f_b( c_0 )+
a\sin({\vec q}.{\vec r}) \left( \frac{\partial f}{\partial c} \right)_{c\,=\,c_0}
+     \frac{1}{2}\,a^2 \sin^2({\vec q}.{\vec r}) \left( \frac{\partial^2 f}{\partial c^2} \right)_{c\,=\,c_0} +a^2\kappa q^2\cos^2({\vec q}.{\vec r})$$

When this is integrated over the volume $V$, the $\sin({\vec q}.{\vec r})$ gives zero, while $\sin^2({\vec q}.{\vec r})$ and $\cos^2({\vec q}.{\vec r})$ integrate to give $V/2$. So, then

$$\frac{\delta F}{V} = \frac{a^2}{4} \left[ \left( \frac{\partial^2 f}{\partial c^2} \right)_{c=c_0} + 2\, \kappa\, q^2 \right]$$

As $a^2>0$, thermodynamic stability requires that the term in brackets be positive. The $2\kappa q^2$ is always positive but tends to zero at small wavevectors, large wavelengths. Since we are interested in macroscopic fluctuations, $q \to 0$, stability requires that the second derivative of the free energy be positive. When it is, there is no spinodal decomposition, but when it is negative, spinodal decomposition will occur. Then fluctuations with wavevectors $q < q_c$ become spontaneously unstable, where the critical wave number $q_c$ is given by:

$$q_c = \sqrt{ \frac{-1}{2 \kappa}\left(\frac{\partial^2 f}{\partial c^2}\right)_{c=c_0} }$$

which corresponds to a fluctuations above a critical wavelength

$$\lambda_c = \sqrt{ -8\pi^2\kappa/\left(\frac{\partial^2 f}{\partial c^2}\right)_{c=c_0} }$$

== Dynamics of spinodal decomposition when molecules move via diffusion ==
Spinodal decomposition can be modeled using a generalized diffusion equation:

$$\frac{\partial c}{\partial t}=M\nabla^2\mu$$

for $\mu$ the chemical potential and $M$ the mobility. As pointed out by Cahn, this equation can be considered as a phenomenological definition of the mobility M, which must by definition be positive. It consists of the ratio of the flux to the local gradient in chemical potential. The chemical potential is a variation of the free energy and when this is the Cahn–Hilliard free energy this is

$$\mu=\frac{\delta F}{\delta c} = \left( \frac{\partial f}{\partial c} \right)_{c=c_0} - 2\kappa\nabla^2 c$$

and so

$$\frac{\partial c}{\partial t}=M\nabla^2\mu=M\left[\left( \frac{\partial^2 f}{\partial c^2} \right)_{c=c_0}\nabla^2 c - 2\kappa\nabla^4 c\right]$$

and now we want to see what happens to a small concentration fluctuation $\delta c=a\exp(\omega t)\sin({\vec q}.{\vec r})$ - note that now it has time dependence as a wavevector dependence. Here $\omega$ is a growth rate. If $\omega < 0$ then the perturbation shrinks to nothing, the system is stable with respect to small perturbations or fluctuations, and there is no spinodal decomposition. However, if $\omega > 0$ then the perturbation grows and the system is unstable with respect to small perturbations or fluctuations: There is spinodal decomposition.

Substituting in this concentration fluctuation, we get

$$\omega \delta c= M\left[-\left(\frac{\partial^2 f}{\partial c^2}\right)_{c=c_0}q^2-2\kappa q^4
\right]\delta c$$

This gives the same expressions for the stability as above, but it also gives an expression for the growth rate of concentration perturbations

$$\omega = Mq^2\left[-\left(\frac{\partial^2 f}{\partial c^2}\right)_{c=c_0}-2\kappa q^2
\right]$$

which has a maximum at a wavevector

$$q_{\rm{max}} = \sqrt{-\left(\frac{\partial^2 f}{\partial c^2}\right)_{c=c_0}/(4\kappa)}$$

So, at least at the beginning of spinodal decomposition, we expect the growing concentrations to mostly have this wavevector.

== Phase diagram ==
This type of phase transformation is known as spinodal decomposition, and can be illustrated on a phase diagram exhibiting a miscibility gap. Thus, phase separation occurs whenever a material transitions into the unstable region of the phase diagram. The boundary of the unstable region sometimes referred to as the binodal or coexistence curve, is found by performing a common tangent construction of the free-energy diagram. Inside the binodal is a region called the spinodal, which is found by determining where the curvature of the free-energy curve is negative. The binodal and spinodal meet at the critical point. It is when a material is moved into the spinodal region of the phase diagram that spinodal decomposition can occur.

The free energy curve is plotted as a function of composition for a temperature below the convolute temperature, T. Equilibrium phase compositions are those corresponding to the free energy minima. Regions of negative curvature (∂^{2}f/∂c^{2} < 0 ) lie within the inflection points of the curve (∂^{2}f/∂c^{2} = 0 ) which are called the spinodes. Their locus as a function of temperature defines the spinodal curve. For compositions within the spinodal, a homogeneous solution is unstable against infinitesimal fluctuations in density or composition, and there is no thermodynamic barrier to the growth of a new phase. Thus, the spinodal represents the limit of physical and chemical stability.

To reach the spinodal region of the phase diagram, a transition must take the material through the binodal region or the critical point. Often phase separation will occur via nucleation during this transition, and spinodal decomposition will not be observed. To observe spinodal decomposition, a very fast transition, often called a quench, is required to move from the stable to the spinodal unstable region of the phase diagram.

In some systems, ordering of the material leads to a compositional instability and this is known as a conditional spinodal, e.g. in the feldspars.

== Coherency strains ==
For most crystalline solid solutions, there is a variation of lattice parameters with the composition. If the lattice of such a solution is to remain coherent in the presence of a composition modulation, mechanical work has to be done to strain the rigid lattice structure. The maintenance of coherency thus affects the driving force for diffusion.

Consider a crystalline solid containing a one-dimensional composition modulation along the x-direction. We calculate the elastic strain energy for a cubic crystal by estimating the work required to deform a slice of material so that it can be added coherently to an existing slab of cross-sectional area. We will assume that the composition modulation is along the x' direction and, as indicated, a prime will be used to distinguish the reference axes from the standard axes of a cubic system (that is, along the <100>).

Let the lattice spacing in the plane of the slab be a_{o} and that of the undeformed slice a. If the slice is to be coherent after the addition of the slab, it must be subjected to a strain ε in the z' and y' directions which is given by:

$$\epsilon = \frac{ a - a_0}{a_0}$$

In the first step, the slice is deformed hydrostatically in order to produce the required strains to the z' and y' directions. We use the linear compressibility of a cubic system 1 / ( c_{11} + 2 c_{12} ) where the c's are the elastic constants. The stresses required to produce a hydrostatic strain of δ are therefore given by:

$$\sigma_{x'} = \sigma_{y'} = \sigma_{z'}$$

The elastic work per unit volume is given by:

$$W_E = \frac{1}{2} \displaystyle \sum_i \sigma_i\epsilon_i$$

where the ε's are the strains. The work performed per unit volume of the slice during the first step is therefore given by:

$$W_E(1) = \frac{3}{2} ( c_{11} + 2 c_{12} ) \epsilon^2$$

In the second step, the sides of the slice parallel to the x' direction are clamped and the stress in this direction is relaxed reversibly. Thus, ε_{z'} = ε_{y'} = 0. The result is that:

$$W_E(2) = \frac{\epsilon^2 (c_{11} + 2 c_{22})}{2c_{11}}$$

The net work performed on the slice in order to achieve coherency is given by:

$$W_E = W_E(1) - W_E(2)$$

or

$$W_E = \frac{\epsilon^2}{2} (c_{11} + 2c_{12} ) \left( 3 - \left[ \frac{c_{11} - 2c_{12}}{c_{1'1'}} \right] \right)$$

The final step is to express c_{1'1'} in terms of the constants referred to the standard axes. From the rotation of axes, we obtain the following:

$$c_{1'1'} = c_{11} + 2(2c_{44} - c_{11} + c_{12}) (l^2m^2 + m^2n^2 + l^2n^2)$$

where l, m, n are the direction cosines of the x' axis and, therefore the direction cosines of the composition modulation. Combining these, we obtain the following:

$$W_E = Y \epsilon^2$$

$$Y = \frac{1}{2} (c_{11} + 2c_{12}) \left[ 3 - \frac{c_{11} + 2c_{12}}{c_{11} + 2(2c_{44} - c_{11} + c_{12})(l^2m^2 + m^2n^2 + l^2n^2)} \right]$$

The existence of any shear strain has not been accounted for. Cahn considered this problem, and concluded that shear would be absent for modulations along <100>, <110>, <111> and that for other directions the effect of shear strains would be small. It then follows that the total elastic strain energy of a slab of cross-sectional area A is given by:

$$W_E = 4 \int Y \epsilon^2~dx$$

We next have to relate the strain δ to the composition variation. Let a_{o} be the lattice parameter of the unstrained solid of the average composition c_{o}. Using a Taylor series expansion about c_{o} yields the following:

$$a = a_0[ 1 + \eta [c-c_0 ] + \cdots ]$$

in which

$$\eta = \frac{1}{a_0} \frac{da}{dc} + \frac{d \ln a}{dc}$$

where the derivatives are evaluated at c_{o}. Thus, neglecting higher-order terms, we have:

$$\epsilon = \frac{a-a_0}{a_0} = \eta ( c- c_0)$$

Substituting, we obtain:

$$W_E = A \int \eta^2 Y (c -c_0)^2~dx$$

This simple result indicates that the strain energy of a composition modulation depends only on the amplitude and is independent of the wavelength. For a given amplitude, the strain energy W_{E} is proportional to Y. Consider a few special cases.

For an isotropic material:

$$2c_{44} -c_{11} + c_{12} = 0$$

so that:

$$Y[\mathrm{iso}] = c_{11} + c_{12} -2 \frac{c_{12}^2}{c_{11}}$$

This equation can also be written in terms of Young's modulus E and Poisson's ratio υ using the standard relationships:

$$c_{11} = \frac{ E (1-\nu)}{(1-2 \nu)(1 + \nu)}$$

$$c_{12} = \frac { E \nu} {(1-2 \nu)(1+\nu)}$$

Substituting, we obtain the following:

$$Y[\mathrm{iso} ] = \frac{E}{1-\nu}$$

For most metals, the left-hand side of this equation

$$2c_{44} - c_{11} + c_{12}$$

is positive, so that the elastic energy will be a minimum for those directions that minimize the term: l^{2}m^{2} + m^{2}n^{2} + l^{2}n^{2}. By inspection, those are seen to be <100>. For this case:

$$Y[\mathrm{100}] = c_{11} + c_{12} -2 \frac{c_{12}^2}{c_{11}}$$

the same as for an isotropic material. At least one metal (molybdenum) has an anisotropy of the opposite sign. In this case, the directions for minimum W_{E} will be those that maximize the directional cosine function. These directions are <111>, and

$$Y[\mathrm{111}] = \frac{ 6c_{44} ( c_{11} + 2c_{12} )}{c_{11} + 2c_{12} + 4c_{44}}$$

As we will see, the growth rate of the modulations will be a maximum in the directions that minimize Y. These directions, therefore, determine the morphology and structural characteristics of the decomposition in cubic solid solutions.

Rewriting the diffusion equation and including the term derived for the elastic energy yields the following:

$$F_t = A \int f(c) + \eta Y (c-c_0)^2 + K\left(\frac{dc}{dx}\right)^2~dx$$

or

$$\frac{\partial c} {\partial t} = \frac{M}{N_\nu} \left( [ f'' + 2 \eta Y ] \frac{d^2 c}{dx^2} - 2K \frac{d^4c}{dx^4} \right)$$

which can alternatively be written in terms of the diffusion coefficient D as:

$$\frac{\partial c} {\partial t} = \left[ 1 + \frac{ 2\eta Y}{f''} \right] \frac{d^2 c}{dx^2} - \frac{2KF}{f''} \frac{d^4c}{dx^4}$$

The simplest way of solving this equation is by using the method of Fourier transforms.

== Fourier transform ==
The motivation for the Fourier transformation comes from the study of a Fourier series. In the study of a Fourier series, complicated periodic functions are written as the sum of simple waves mathematically represented by sines and cosines. Due to the properties of sine and cosine, it is possible to recover the amount of each wave in the sum by an integral. In many cases it is desirable to use Euler's formula, which states that e^{2πiθ} = cos 2πθ + i sin 2πθ, to write Fourier series in terms of the basic waves e^{2πiθ}, with the distinct advantage of simplifying many unwieldy formulas.

The passage from sines and cosines to complex exponentials makes it necessary for the Fourier coefficients to be complex-valued. The usual interpretation of this complex number is that it gives both the amplitude (or size) of the wave present in the function and the phase (or the initial angle) of the wave. This passage also introduces the need for negative "frequencies". (E.G. If θ were measured in seconds then the waves e^{2πiθ} and e^{−2πiθ} would both complete one cycle per second—but they represent different frequencies in the Fourier transform. Hence, frequency no longer measures the number of cycles per unit time, but is closely related.)

If A(β) is the amplitude of a Fourier component of wavelength λ and wavenumber β = 2π/λ the spatial variation in composition can be expressed by the Fourier integral:

$$c - c_0  = \int A(\beta) \exp (i \beta x)~d\beta$$

in which the coefficients are defined by the inverse relationship:

$$A(\beta) = \frac{1}{2\pi} \int (c-c_0) \exp(-i\beta x) ~dx$$

Substituting, we obtain on equating coefficients:

$$\frac{dA(\beta)}{dt} = - \frac{M}{N_\nu} [ f'' + 2 \eta^2Y + 2Y\beta^2 ] \beta^2 A(\beta)$$

This is an ordinary differential equation that has the solution:

$$A(\beta,t) = A(\beta,0) \exp[ R(\beta) t]$$

in which A(β) is the initial amplitude of the Fourier component of wave wavenumber β and R(β) defined by:

$$R(\beta) = - \frac{M}{N_\nu} (f '' + 2\eta Y + 2k\beta^2)\beta^2$$

or, expressed in terms of the diffusion coefficient D:

$$R(\beta) = -\tilde{D} \left(1 + \frac{2\eta^2 Y}{f''} + \frac{2K}{f''}\beta^2 \right) \beta^2$$

In a similar manner, the new diffusion equation:

$$\frac{\partial c }{ \partial t} = M \frac{\partial^2 f}{\partial c^2} \nabla^2 c - 2MK\nabla^4 c)$$

has a simple sine wave solution given by:

$$c - c_0 = exp[R\bar{\beta}t] cos\beta \cdot r$$

where $R(\beta)$ is obtained by substituting this solution back into the diffusion equation as follows:

$$R(\bar{\beta}) - M\beta^2 \left( \frac{\partial^2 f}{\partial c^2} + 2 K \beta^2 \right)$$

For solids, the elastic strains resulting from coherency add terms to the amplification factor $R(\beta)$ as follows:

$$R(\bar{\beta}) = - M\beta^2 \left( \frac{\partial^2 f}{\partial c^2} + 2\eta^2 Y + 2K\beta^2 \right)$$

where, for isotropic solids:

$$Y = \frac{E}{1-\nu}$$,

where E is Young's modulus of elasticity, ν is Poisson's ratio, and η is the linear strain per unit composition difference. For anisotropic solids, the elastic term depends on the direction in a manner that can be predicted by elastic constants and how the lattice parameters vary with composition. For the cubic case, Y is a minimum for either (100) or (111) directions, depending only on the sign of the elastic anisotropy.

Thus, by describing any composition fluctuation in terms of its Fourier components, Cahn showed that a solution would be unstable concerning to the sinusoidal fluctuations of a critical wavelength. By relating the elastic strain energy to the amplitudes of such fluctuations, he formalized the wavelength or frequency dependence of the growth of such fluctuations, and thus introduced the principle of selective amplification of Fourier components of certain wavelengths. The treatment yields the expected mean particle size or wavelength of the most rapidly growing fluctuation.

Thus, the amplitude of composition fluctuations should grow continuously until a metastable equilibrium is reached with preferential amplification of components of particular wavelengths. The kinetic amplification factor R is negative when the solution is stable to the fluctuation, zero at the critical wavelength, and positive for longer wavelengths—exhibiting a maximum at exactly $\sqrt{2}$ times the critical wavelength.

Consider a homogeneous solution within the spinodal. It will initially have a certain amount of fluctuation from the average composition which may be written as a Fourier integral. Each Fourier component of that fluctuation will grow or diminish according to its wavelength.

Because of the maximum in R as a function of wavelength, those components of the fluctuation with $\sqrt{2}$ times the critical wavelength will grow fastest and will dominate. This "principle of selective amplification" depends on the initial presence of these wavelengths but does not critically depend on their exact amplitude relative to other wavelengths (if the time is large compared with (1/R). It does not depend on any additional assumptions, since different wavelengths can coexist and do not interfere with one another.

Limitations of this theory would appear to arise from this assumption and the absence of an expression formulated to account for irreversible processes during phase separation which may be associated with internal friction and entropy production. In practice, frictional damping is generally present and some of the energy is transformed into thermal energy. Thus, the amplitude and intensity of a one-dimensional wave decrease with distance from the source, and for a three-dimensional wave, the decrease will be greater.

== Dynamics in k-space ==
In the spinodal region of the phase diagram, the free energy can be lowered by allowing the components to separate, thus increasing the relative concentration of a component material in a particular region of the material. The concentration will continue to increase until the material reaches the stable part of the phase diagram. Very large regions of material will change their concentration slowly due to the amount of material that must be moved. Very small regions will shrink away due to the energy cost of maintaining an interface between two dissimilar component materials.

To initiate a homogeneous quench a control parameter, such as temperature, is abruptly and globally changed. For a binary mixture of $A$-type and $B$-type materials, the Landau free-energy

$$F=\int\!\left(\frac{A}{2}\phi^2+\frac{B}{4}\phi^4 + \frac{\kappa}{2}\left(\nabla\phi\right)^2\right)~dx\;.$$

is a good approximation of the free energy near the critical point and is often used to study homogeneous quenches. The mixture concentration $\phi=\rho_A-\rho_B$ is the density difference of the mixture components, the control parameters which determine the stability of the mixture are $A$ and $B$, and the interfacial energy cost is determined by $\kappa$.

Diffusive motion often dominates at the length-scale of spinodal decomposition. The equation of motion for a diffusive system is

$$\partial_t\phi=\nabla ( m\nabla\mu + \xi(x) )\;,$$

where $m$ is the diffusive mobility, $\xi(x)$ is some random noise such that $\langle\xi(x)\rangle=0$, and the chemical potential $\mu$ is derived from the Landau free-energy:

$$\mu=\frac{\delta F}{\delta \phi}=A\phi+B\phi^3-\kappa \nabla^2 \phi\;.$$

We see that if $A<0$, small fluctuations around $\phi=0$ have a negative effective diffusive mobility and will grow rather than shrink. To understand the growth dynamics, we disregard the fluctuating currents due to $\xi$, linearize the equation of motion around $\phi=\phi_{in}$ and perform a Fourier transform into $k$-space. This leads to

$$\partial_t\tilde{\phi}(k,t)=-m((A + 3B\phi_{in}^2)k^2 + \kappa k^4)\tilde{\phi}(k,t)=R(k)\tilde{\phi}(k,t)\;,$$

which has an exponential growth solution:

$$\tilde{\phi}(k,t) = \exp(R(k)t)\;.$$

Since the growth rate $R(k)$ is exponential, the fastest growing angular wavenumber

$$k_{sp} = \sqrt{\frac{-(A+3B\phi_{in}^2)}{2\kappa}}\;,$$

will quickly dominate the morphology. We now see that spinodal decomposition results in domains of the characteristic length scale called the spinodal length:

$$\lambda_{sp} = \frac{2\pi}{k_{sp}} = 2\pi\sqrt{\frac{2\kappa}{-(A+3B\phi_{in}^2)}}\;.$$

The growth rate of the fastest-growing angular wave number is

$$R(k_{sp})=-m((A + 3B\phi_{in}^2)k_{sp}^2 + \kappa k_{sp}^4)=\frac{m(A+3B\phi_{in}^2)^2}{4\kappa} = \frac{1}{t_{sp}}$$

where $t_{sp}$ is known as the spinodal time.

The spinodal length and spinodal time can be used to nondimensionalize the equation of motion, resulting in universal scaling for spinodal decomposition.

== Spinodal architected materials ==
Example design of a spinodal architected material

Spinodal phase decomposition has been used to generate architected materials by interpreting one phase as solid, and the other phase as void. These spinodal architected materials present interesting mechanical properties, such as high energy absorption, insensitivity to imperfections, superior mechanical resilience, and high stiffness-to-weight ratio. Furthermore, by controlling the phase separation, i.e., controlling the proportion of materials, and/or imposing preferential directions in the decompositions, one can control the density, and preferential directions effectively tuning the strength, weight, and anisotropy of the resulting architected material. Another interesting property of spinodal materials is the capability to seamlessly transition between different classes, orientations, and densities, thereby enabling the manufacturing of effectively multi-material structures.
