= Fujita–Storm equation =

In applied mathematics, Fujita–Storm equation is a nonlinear partial differential equation. It occurs frequently in problems of nonlinear heat and mass transfer, combustion theory and theory of flows in porous media

$u_{t}=a (u^{-2} u_x)_x$
