= Brogren =

Brogren is a surname. Notable people with the surname include:

- Lena Brogren (1929–2005), Swedish actress
- Per-Olof Brogren (born 1939), Swedish speed skater
- Stefan Brogren (born 1972), Canadian actor, director, and producer

== See also ==
- Brogden (disambiguation)
