= Lin–Tsien equation =

The Lin–Tsien equation (named after C. C. Lin and H. S. Tsien) is an integrable partial differential equation

$$2u_{tx}+u_xu_{xx}-u_{yy} = 0.$$

Integrability of this equation follows from its being, modulo an appropriate linear change of dependent and independent variables, a potential form of the dispersionless KP equation. Namely, if $u$ satisfies the Lin–Tsien equation, then $v=u_x$ satisfies, modulo the said change of variables, the dispersionless KP equation. The Lin-Tsien equation admits a (3+1)-dimensional integrable generalization, see.
