= Broer–Kaup equations =

The Broer–Kaup equations are a set of two coupled nonlinear partial differential equations:

$$u_{y,t}+(2 u u_x)_x + 2v_{xx} - u_{xxy}=0$$
$$v_t + 2(vu)_x + v_{xx}=0$$
