= Nonlinear partial differential equation =

Partial differential equation with nonlinear terms

In mathematics and physics, a nonlinear partial differential equation is a partial differential equation with nonlinear terms. They describe many different physical systems, ranging from gravitation to fluid dynamics, and have been used in mathematics to solve problems such as the Poincaré conjecture and the Calabi conjecture. They are difficult to study: almost no general techniques exist that work for all such equations, and usually each individual equation has to be studied as a separate problem.

The distinction between a linear and a nonlinear partial differential equation is usually made in terms of the properties of the operator that defines the PDE itself.

== Methods for studying nonlinear partial differential equations ==
=== Existence and uniqueness of solutions ===
A fundamental question for any PDE is the existence and uniqueness of a solution for given boundary conditions. For nonlinear equations these questions are in general very hard: for example, the hardest part of Yau's solution of the Calabi conjecture was the proof of existence for a Monge–Ampere equation. The open problem of existence (and smoothness) of solutions to the Navier–Stokes equations is one of the seven Millennium Prize problems in mathematics.

=== Singularities ===
The basic questions about singularities (their formation, propagation, and removal, and regularity of solutions) are the same as for linear PDE, but as usual much harder to study. In the linear case one can just use spaces of distributions, but nonlinear PDEs are not usually defined on arbitrary distributions, so one replaces spaces of distributions by refinements such as Sobolev spaces.

An example of singularity formation is given by the Ricci flow: Richard S. Hamilton showed that while short time solutions exist, singularities will usually form after a finite time. Grigori Perelman's solution of the Poincaré conjecture depended on a deep study of these singularities, where he showed how to continue the solution past the singularities.

=== Linear approximation ===
The solutions in a neighborhood of a known solution can sometimes be studied by linearizing the PDE around the solution. This corresponds to studying the tangent space of a point of the moduli space of all solutions.

=== Moduli space of solutions ===
Ideally one would like to describe the (moduli) space of all solutions explicitly, and for some very special PDEs this is possible. (In general this is a hopeless problem: it is unlikely that there is any useful description of all solutions of the Navier–Stokes equation for example, as this would involve describing all possible fluid motions.) If the equation has a very large symmetry group, then one is usually only interested in the moduli space of solutions modulo the symmetry group, and this is sometimes a finite-dimensional compact manifold, possibly with singularities; for example, this happens in the case of the Seiberg–Witten equations. A slightly more complicated case is the self dual Yang–Mills equations, when the moduli space is finite-dimensional but not necessarily compact, though it can often be compactified explicitly. Another case when one can sometimes hope to describe all solutions is the case of completely integrable models, when solutions are sometimes a sort of superposition of solitons; this happens e.g. for the Korteweg–de Vries equation.

=== Exact solutions ===
It is often possible to write down some special solutions explicitly in terms of elementary functions (though it is rarely possible to describe all solutions like this). One way of finding such explicit solutions is to reduce the equations to equations of lower dimension, preferably ordinary differential equations, which can often be solved exactly. This can sometimes be done using separation of variables, or by looking for highly symmetric solutions.

Some equations have several different exact solutions.

=== Numerical solutions ===
Numerical solution on a computer is often the only method that can be used for getting information about arbitrary systems of PDEs. There has been a lot of work done, but a lot of work still remains on solving certain systems numerically, especially for the Navier–Stokes and other equations related to weather prediction.

=== Lax pair ===
If a system of PDEs can be put into Lax pair form

$$\frac{dL}{dt}=LA-AL$$

then it usually has an infinite number of first integrals, which help to study it.

=== Euler–Lagrange equations ===
Systems of PDEs often arise as the Euler–Lagrange equations for a variational problem. Systems of this form can sometimes be solved by finding an extremum of the original variational problem.

=== Integrable systems ===
PDEs that arise from integrable systems are often the easiest to study, and can sometimes be completely solved. A well-known example is the Korteweg–de Vries equation.

=== Symmetry ===
Some systems of PDEs have large symmetry groups. For example, the Yang–Mills equations are invariant under an infinite-dimensional gauge group, and many systems of equations (such as the Einstein field equations) are invariant under diffeomorphisms of the underlying manifold. Any such symmetry groups can usually be used to help study the equations; in particular if one solution is known one can trivially generate more by acting with the symmetry group.

Sometimes equations are parabolic or hyperbolic "modulo the action of some group": for example, the Ricci flow equation is not quite parabolic, but is "parabolic modulo the action of the diffeomorphism group", which implies that it has most of the good properties of parabolic equations.

== List of equations ==
See the extensive List of nonlinear partial differential equations.

== See also ==
- Euler–Lagrange equation
- Nonlinear system
- Integrable system
- Inverse scattering transform
- Dispersive partial differential equation
