= Patrick H. Diamond =

American theoretical plasma physicist

- Born: Patrick Henry Diamond
- Education: Massachusetts Institute of Technology (Ph.D.)
- Awards: Sloan Fellowship (1988); Hannes Alfvén Prize (2011)
- Scientific career
- Fields: Plasma physics
- Institutions: University of California San Diego
- Thesis: Theory of phase space density granulation in magnetoplasma (1979)
- Doctoral advisor: Thomas H. Dupree

Patrick Henry Diamond is an American theoretical plasma physicist. He is currently a professor at the University of California, San Diego, and a director of the Fusion Theory Institute at the National Fusion Research Institute in Daejeon, South Korea, where the KSTAR Tokamak is operated.

In 2011, Diamond was jointly awarded the Hannes Alfvén Prize with Akira Hasegawa and Kunioki Mima for important contributions to the theory of turbulent transport in plasmas. In addition to applications in controlled nuclear fusion, he also specializes in astrophysical plasmas.

== Early life and career ==
Diamond was raised in the Bay Ridge section of Brooklyn, NY. He graduated St. Anselm's Elementary School and Xavierian High School, both located in Bay Ridge Brooklyn, NY Diamond received his Ph.D. in 1979 from the Massachusetts Institute of Technology.

== Honors and awards ==
In 1986, he was inducted a fellow of the American Physical Society. In 1988, he became a Sloan Research Fellow.

In 2011, Diamond was awarded the Hannes Alfvén Prize by the European Physical Society for "laying the foundations of modern numerical transport simulations and key contributions on self-generated zonal flows and flow shear decorrelation mechanisms which form the basis of modern turbulence in plasmas".

== Publications ==
- Diamond, P H; Hasegawa, A; Mima, K (November 14, 2011). "Vorticity dynamics, drift wave turbulence, and zonal flows: a look back and a look ahead". Plasma Physics and Controlled Fusion. 53 (12) 124001. Bibcode:2011PPCF...53l4001D. doi:10.1088/0741-3335/53/12/124001. ISSN 0741-3335. S2CID 21051033.
- Biglari, H.; Diamond, P. H.; Terry, P. W. (1990). "Influence of sheared poloidal rotation on edge turbulence". Physics of Fluids B: Plasma Physics. 2 (1): 1–4. Bibcode:1990PhFlB...2....1B. doi:10.1063/1.859529. ISSN 0899-8221.
- Gang, F. Y.; Diamond, P. H.; Crotinger, J. A.; Koniges, A. E. (1991). "Statistical dynamics of dissipative drift wave turbulence". Physics of Fluids B: Plasma Physics. 3 (4): 955–968. Bibcode:1991PhFlB...3..955G. doi:10.1063/1.859851. ISSN 0899-8221.
- Carreras, B. A.; Sidikman, K.; Diamond, P. H.; Terry, P. W.; Garcia, L. (1992). "Theory of shear flow effects on long-wavelength drift wave turbulence". Physics of Fluids B: Plasma Physics. 4 (10): 3115–3131. Bibcode:1992PhFlB...4.3115C. doi:10.1063/1.860420. ISSN 0899-8221.
- Gruzinov, A. V.; Diamond, P. H. (1994). "Self-consistent theory of mean-field electrodynamics". Physical Review Letters. 72 (11): 1651–1653. Bibcode:1994PhRvL..72.1651G. doi:10.1103/physrevlett.72.1651. ISSN 0031-9007. PMID 10055666.
- Diamond, P. H.; Liang, Y.-M.; Carreras, B. A.; Terry, P. W. (1994). "Self-Regulating Shear Flow Turbulence: A Paradigm for the L to H Transition". Physical Review Letters. 72 (16): 2565–2568. Bibcode:1994PhRvL..72.2565D. doi:10.1103/physrevlett.72.2565. ISSN 0031-9007. PMID 10055916.
- Diamond, Patrick H. (2010). Relaxation dynamics in laboratory and astrophysical plasmas. World Scientific. OCLC 748930038.
- Diamond, Patrick H. (2007). The legacy of Marshall Rosenbluth: history of plasma physics. Stefan University Press. ISBN 978-1-889545-72-1. OCLC 159919457.
- Diamond, Patrick H.; Itoh, Sanae-I.; Itoh, Kimitaka (2009). Modern Plasma Physics. Cambridge: Cambridge University Press. doi:10.1017/cbo9780511780875. ISBN 978-0-511-78087-5.
