= Zonal and meridional flow =

Directions of fluid flow on a globe

A zonal region on the globe

Zonal and meridional flow are directions and regions of fluid flow on a globe. Zonal flow follows a pattern along latitudinal lines, latitudinal circles or in the west–east direction. Meridional flow follows a pattern from north to south, or from south to north, along the Earth's longitude lines, longitudinal circles (meridian) or in the north–south direction. These terms are often used in the atmospheric and earth sciences to describe global phenomena, such as "meridional wind", or "zonal average temperature".

In the context of physics, zonal flow connotes a tendency of flux to conform to a pattern parallel to the equator of a sphere. In meteorological term regarding atmospheric circulation, zonal flow brings a temperature contrast along the Earth's longitude. Extratropical cyclones in zonal flows tend to be weaker, moving faster and producing relatively little impact on local weather.

Extratropical cyclones in meridional flows tend to be stronger and move slower. This pattern is responsible for most instances of extreme weather, as not only are storms stronger in this type of flow regime, but temperatures can reach extremes as well, producing heat waves and cold waves depending on the equator-ward or poleward direction of the flow.

For vector fields (such as wind velocity), the zonal component (or x-coordinate) is denoted as u, while the meridional component (or y-coordinate) is denoted as v.

In plasma physics, "zonal flow" means poloidal, which is the opposite from the meaning in planetary atmospheres and weather/climate studies.

== See also ==
- Meridione
- Zonal flow (plasma)
- Zonal/poloidal
