= Akira Hasegawa =

Japanese theoretical physicist (1934–2025)

- 長谷川晃
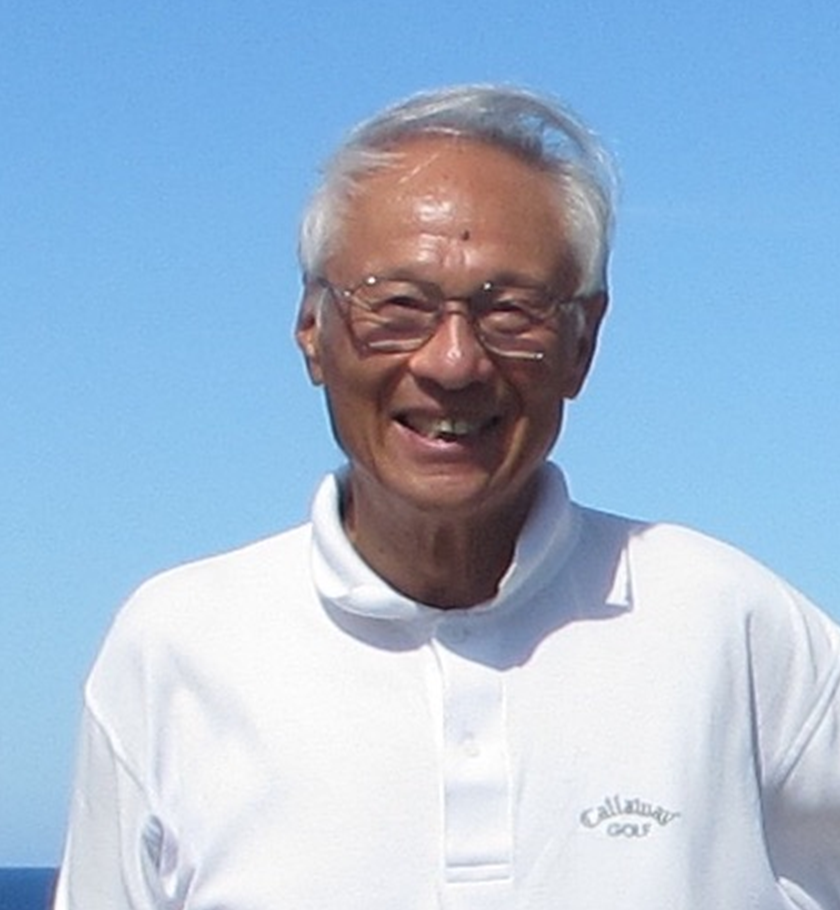
- Born: 17 June 1934; Tokyo, Japan
- Died: 22 June 2025 (aged 91)
- Education: University of Osaka (B.E., M.E.); University of California, Berkeley (Ph.D.); Nagoya University (Sc.D.)
- Known for: Hasegawa–Mima equation; Hasegawa–Wakatani equation; Kinetic Alfvén wave; Levitated dipole
- Awards: Rank Prize (1991); Shida Rinzaburō Prize (1993); Hattori Hōkō Prize (1993); Moet Hennessy-Louis Vuitton Da Vinci of Excellence Prize (1995); C&C Prize (1995); IEEE/LEOS Quantum Electronics Award (1999); James Clerk Maxwell Prize for Plasma Physics (2000); Japan Academy Prize (2008); Hannes Alfvén Prize (2011)
- Scientific career
- Fields: Plasma physics, Optical solitons
- Workplaces: Bell Labs; University of Osaka; Nagoya University; Columbia University; École Polytechnique Fédérale de Lausanne
- Thesis: Plasma Computer Simulation Using Sheet Current Model (1964)
- Doctoral advisor: Charles K. Birdsall

Akira Hasegawa (Japanese: 長谷川 晃, Hepburn: Hasegawa Akira; 17 June 1934 – 22 June 2025) was a Japanese theoretical physicist and engineer who worked in the U.S. and Japan. He is known for his work in the derivation of the Hasegawa–Mima equation, which describes fundamental plasma turbulence and the consequent generation of zonal flow that controls plasma diffusion. Hasegawa also made the discovery of optical solitons in glass fibers, a concept that is essential for high speed optical communications.

Hasegawa was the first to suggest the existence of optical solitons in 1973. In 1974, he (together with Liu Chen) showed that plasmas could be heated with the kinetic Alfvén wave. Hasegawa and Chen introduced the concept of the kinetic Alfven wave to illustrate the microscopic process of the Alfven wave heating. In 1977, Hasegawa introduced the Hasegawa–Mima equation to describe turbulence in Tokamak plasmas and then further developed it in the 1980s (with Masahiro Wakatani) to obtain the Hasegawa–Wakatani equation. The equation predicted an inverse cascade in the turbulent energy spectrum (i.e., from small to large wavelengths) and zonal flows (in the azimuthal direction in the Tokamak) that can control radial turbulent diffusion. With Wakatani, he wrote a paper on self-organized turbulence in plasmas.

Hasegawa's proposal to trap plasmas with a dipole magnet similar to Earth's magnetic field, where turbulence caused by solar wind stabilizes the trap, was implemented in the first dipole plasma experiment at University of Tokyo by Prof. Zensho Yoshida. In 2010, a plasma experiment with a floating dipole was also built at the Massachusetts Institute of Technology.

== Personal life and views ==
Hasegawa was born on 17 June 1934, in Tokyo Prefecture. He was a graduate of the Department of Communications Engineering at the University of Osaka, Japan and was a Fulbright student at the University of California, Berkeley, where he completed his Ph.D. under the supervision of Charles K. Birdsall in 1964. The title of his dissertation was Plasma Computer Simulation Using Sheet Current Model.

He subsequently took a post doctoral position at Bell Laboratories for six months, where he worked with Solomon J. Buchsbaum. Hasegawa was an associate professor in the Faculty of Engineering Science of the University of Osaka from 1964 to 1968. During this period, he served as a visiting professor at the Institute of Plasma Physics at Nagoya University and received the Doctor of Science Degree from the Department of Physics at Nagoya University.

Hasegawa rejoined Bell Laboratories in 1968, where he stayed as a distinguished member of technical staff until 1991. During his time at Bell Laboratories, he also became an adjunct professor in the Department of Applied Physics at Columbia University from 1971. He was a Distinguished Visiting Professor at the École Polytechnique Fédérale de Lausanne in 1980 as well as a visiting professor at the Institute of Laser Engineering at Osaka University. Hasegawa was elected as Chairman of the Division of Plasma Physics of the American Physical Society in 1990, when he reported to the President the importance of fusion research based on advanced fuels to avoid undesirable consequences of deuterium tritium fusion. In 1991, he resigned from Bell Laboratories and transferred to the Faculty of Engineering at Osaka University. He retired in 1998.

In addition to over 250 scientific papers and several text books, Hasegawa published a number of books on the subjects of Japanese and Zen culture, which he learned from his spiritual teacher, Kobori Nanrei Sohaku of the Daitoku-ji temple. Following his retirement from Osaka University, he took a position as a lecturer at Kobe Women's University to teach a course on Happiness for Japanese Women, upon request of the founder of the university, Mrs. Kaname Yukiyoshi. He also worked as a professor at Himeji Dokkyo University and Kochi University of Technology and was a special consultant with NTT Japan and BTG International.

Akira Hasegawa was born to Japanese parents who were divorced when he was very young. He was primarily raised by his mother, Kaoru Takata, who was a graduate of Science and Mathematics Department in Nara Women's University His mother was a strong influence in developing his interest in mathematics. Hasegawa played on a baseball team while at Nagasaka Junior High School. At Itami High School he was a member of the Science Club. While at Osaka University, he also played trombone in a Dixieland Jazz Band, which he and his friend formed. He spent all of his scholarship money to purchase a large collection of jazz records, extending from Bix Beiderbecke to Miles Davis.

In March 1961, prior to moving to the United States, Hasegawa was married to Miyoko. Together, they have two sons, Tomohiro and Atsushi, and a daughter, Akiko. He played tennis but mostly enjoyed playing golf. Akira enjoyed being a member of the Rotary Club of Kyoto-East and publishing books on various non-science themes including history, finance, and culture. He believed that Japan is a country established on a unique matriarchal culture during the Jomon period, some ten thousands of years BC.

In addition to an extensive academic publication record and the editorship and authorship of numerous scientific research level text books, Hasegawa was prolific in the publication of various aspects of culture and philosophy in the past few years, writing on diverse topics such as life and entropy, the economy and finance, Lao Tzu and Confucius, as well as Japanese culture and religion. Many of the texts are available electronically in Japanese, as well as in English and include such titles as: "A Story of Life and Health", "A Story of Money", "Fund Management for those near Retirement", "Method of Investments for Private Pension", "The One World of Lao Tzu and Modern Physics: A Dialogue with a Zen Abbot", "Mai and Dance and Japanese Culture", "Enjoying Wine", "Science and Religion", "How to Increase Productivity in Service Industries", "Japanese Women Changing the World".

Hasegawa died on 22 June 2025, at the age of 91.

== Research activities ==
Hasegawa made a number of seminal contributions in the subject of waves and turbulence in plasmas as well as in information transfer in optical fibers. While at Bell Labs as a post doc, he succeeded in the theoretical explanation of a unique resonant phenomenon in magnetized plasma, referred to as the Buchsbaum–Hasegawa resonance. While at the Faculty of Engineering Science Osaka University, he pioneered a computer simulation of plasmas in magnetic fields and supervised numerous students, including, Tetsuo Kamimura (Professor, Meijo University), Katsunobu Nishihara (Professor, Osaka University) and Hideo Okuda (Professor, Princeton University). Kiyoshi Yatsui (Professor, Nagaoka University of Technology) was an assistant in his group. During this period, he became acquainted with Professor Toshiya Taniuchi of Nagoya University. Professor Taniuchi then became a mentor of Hasegawa on nonlinear waves in plasmas and fluids.

In 1968, while at Bell Laboratories, Hasegawa joined a group in charge of space plasmas. His first theoretical work was to show that the observed oscillation on a satellite in the Earth's magnetosphere can be explained by an excitation of mirror instability coupled with a drift wave mode and named it the drift mirror instability. This has become a pioneering work in space plasma instabilities. In 1973, while he was working on studies of the nonlinear evolution of Whistler wave envelope, he discovered the same equation, the nonlinear Schrödinger equation, applied to the envelope of light pulses in glass fibers. With the help of computer simulation undertaken in collaboration with Fred Tappert, he demonstrated transmission of a stable nonlinear optical pulse in fiber, which was later to be known as the optical soliton. The experimental verification of existence of the optical soliton was first made by L. F. Mollenauer et al of Bell Laboratories in 1980. The nonlinear Schrödinger equation is now widely used for simulation of optical signal transfer in fibers over inter-continental distances and not solely limited to solitons.

Hasegawa and Liu Chen succeeded in explaining the Earth's magnetic oscillation mechanism (now known as the Chen–Hasegawa resonance) which was observed by his colleague, Louis J. Lanzerotti. This work also lead them to discover a new wave now called the kinetic Alfvén wave that resolved the magnetohydrodynamic singularity. A Bell Labs team of Cliff Surko (Professor at University of California, San Diego) and Richart E. Slusher (Georgia Tech) discovered low frequency plasma turbulence by laser scattering in the Princeton plasma machine. Hasegawa with Kunioki Mima derived a two dimensional nonlinear wave equation that describes the observed turbulence spectra. This equation, now called the Hasegawa–Mima equation, is widely used as the fundamental equation to describe low frequency plasma turbulence. One unique property of the equation is the existence of an inverse cascade of turbulent spectra which may form coherent structures such as zonal flow in the azimuthal direction in cylindrical plasmas. Hasegawa with Masahiro Wakatani extended the equation to the realistic geometry of plasmas confined in a toroidal magnetic field (Hasegawa–Wakatani equation) and demonstrated the universal excitation of zonal flow as the consequence of turbulence. To meet the needs of the high pressure confinement for advanced fusion fuel such as deuterium-helium-3, in 1987 Hasegawa proposed a plasma confinement by a dipole magnetic field generated by floating superconducting ring current. Devices based on this idea were built at University of Tokyo by a research group headed by Professor Z. Yoshida and by MIT and Columbia University team led by Professors J. Kesner and M.E. Mauel, and successful high pressure plasma confinements were demonstrated.

In September 1991, Hasegawa took a position of Professor of Communications Engineering in the Faculty of Engineering at Osaka University and started a new group of optical soliton based communication systems. He established international as well as domestic research groups that concentrated on ultra-high speed communications based on optical solitons. The group successfully demonstrated soliton based, all-optical ultra high speed communication over inter-continental distances. A student during this period, Toshihiko Hirooka now works as a professor at Tohoku University.

After retirement, Hasegawa proposed two important concepts in fusion devices. One is the idea that a fusion device operates as a power amplifier rather than as a reactor. Here, the device operates with the help of continuous injection of electromagnetic power that provides negentropy which maintains the desirable plasma pressure profile. The other is the concept of chiral asymmetry of vortices generated in plasma turbulence where vortices having positive (negative) core charge tends to expand (to shrink) which is essential in the formation of proper zonal flow for plasma confinement.

== Honors and awards ==
Hasegawa was a Fellow of IEEE and the American Physical Society. Internationally, he was recognized as a recipient of the 1991 Rank Prize (British), 1995 Moet Hennessy, Louis Vuitton Da Vinci of Excellence Prize (French), 1999 IEEE/LEOS Quantum Electronics Award, and the 2000 James Clerk Maxwell Prize for Plasma Physics of the American Physical Society. In his citation, his innovative discoveries and fundamental contributions to the theory of turbulence of nonlinear drift waves, the spread of Alfvén waves in the laboratory and in space plasma, as well as optical solitons and their application in telecommunications were highlighted. He also shared with Kuniaki Mima and Pat Diamond the 2011 European Physical Society Hannes Alfvén Prize.

Domestically, Hasegawa received several awards including, the 1996 C&C Prize, 1996 Achievement Prize of the Institute of Electronics, Information and Communication Engineers (Japan), 1993 Shida Rinzaburo Prize (Japanese Ministry of Post and Telecommunications) and the 1995 Hattori (Seiko) Houkou Prize. He received the 2008 Japan Academy Prize and in 2010 The Order of the Sacred Treasure, Gold Rays with Neck Ribbon from the Japanese Emperor.
