= Kunioki Mima =

Japanese plasma physicist (1945–2025)

- 三間圀興
- Born: 17 August 1945
- Died: 5 January 2025 (aged 79)
- Education: Kyoto University (B.S., Ph.D.)
- Awards: Edward Teller Award (2007); Hannes Alfvén Prize (2011)
- Scientific career
- Fields: Plasma physics
- Thesis: (1973)

Kunioki Mima (三間 圀興, Mima Kunioki; 17 August 1945 – 5 January 2025) was a Japanese plasma physicist. He is known for his contributions to the theory of turbulent transport in plasmas, and in particular the derivation of the Hasegawa–Mima equation in 1977, which won him the 2011 Hannes Alfvén Prize.

== Life and career ==
Mima studied physics at Kyoto University and graduated with a bachelor's degree in 1968 and a PhD in 1973. He was a post-doctoral student at Hiroshima University until 1975 and then started work at Osaka University, where he became an assistant professor in 1978 and a professor in 1984. From 1995 to 1999, he was director of the Institute of Laser Engineering. There, his work involved laser fusion (experiments with the Gekko XII laser and FIREX program), free electron lasers, relativistic plasmas and laser-plasma interaction.

Mima died on 5 January 2025, at the age of 79.

== Honors and awards ==
Mima was a Fellow of the American Physical Society and a Member of the Physical Society of Japan and the Japan Society of Plasma Science at Nuclear Fusion Research.

He was a co-recipient of the 1993 John Dawson Award for Excellence in Plasma Physics Research and won the 2007 Edward Teller Award. He was jointly awarded the 2011 Hannes Alfvén Prize (with Akira Hasegawa and Patrick H. Diamond) for "laying the foundations of modern numerical transport simulations and key contributions on self-generated zonal flows and flow shear decorrelation mechanisms which form the basis of modern turbulence in plasmas".
