= Nematicon =

In optics, a nematicon is a spatial soliton in nematic liquid crystals (NLC). The name was invented in 2003 by G. Assanto. and used thereafter Nematicons are generated by a special type of optical nonlinearity present in NLC: the light induced reorientation of the molecular director (i.e. the average molecular orientation). This nonlinearity arises from the fact that the molecular director (i.e., the optic axis of the corresponding uniaxial) tends to align along the electric field of light. Nematicons are easy to generate (with mW optical power or less) because the NLC dielectric medium exhibits the following properties:

- A very large nonlinear response : the effective nonlinearity is typically eight orders of magnitude larger than that of carbon disulfide. This means that much lower optical powers are necessary to obtain the same refractive index variation (increase) or self-focusing to balance out diffraction.
- A nonlocal response : the nonlinear response is not limited to the location of the optical field. Instead the response profile is wider than the light beam. A high nonlocality allows for stable soliton propagation even in the case of two transverse dimensions. Higher or lower powers than the exact value required for a soliton to exist lead to breathing solitons.

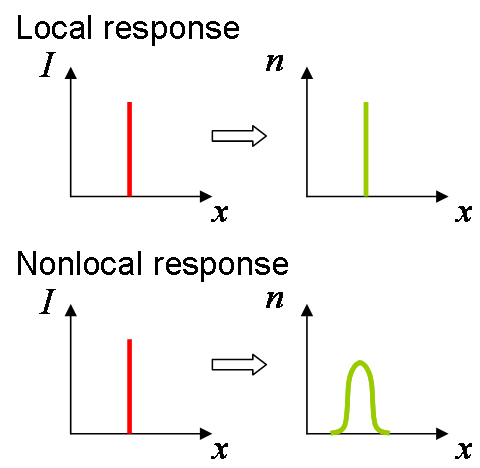
The difference between a nonlocal and a local response. In a local medium a pointwise intensity peak such as a Dirac delta gives rise to an equally sharp spatial response in refractive index. In a nonlocal medium the refractive index change extends well past the source, similar to a diffusive system.

- A saturable all-optical response: the director of the liquid crystal tends to align along the electric field of the light beam. For powerful beams the molecular director becomes parallel to the field and no further reorientation is possible. Response saturation also stabilizes two-dimensional solitons.

Since the reorientational optical nonlinearity of nematic liquid crystals is accompanied by an electro-optic response to low-frequency electric fields, i.e. applied voltages, nematicons and the associated waveguides can be steered in angle and routed in space by the application of an external bias, leading to reconfigurable interconnects.

In waveguide arrays where discrete solitons are knows to form, discrete nematicons have also been demonstrated

== See also ==
- Soliton (optics)
- Liquid crystals
