= Fred Tappert =

American physicist

Frederick Drach Tappert
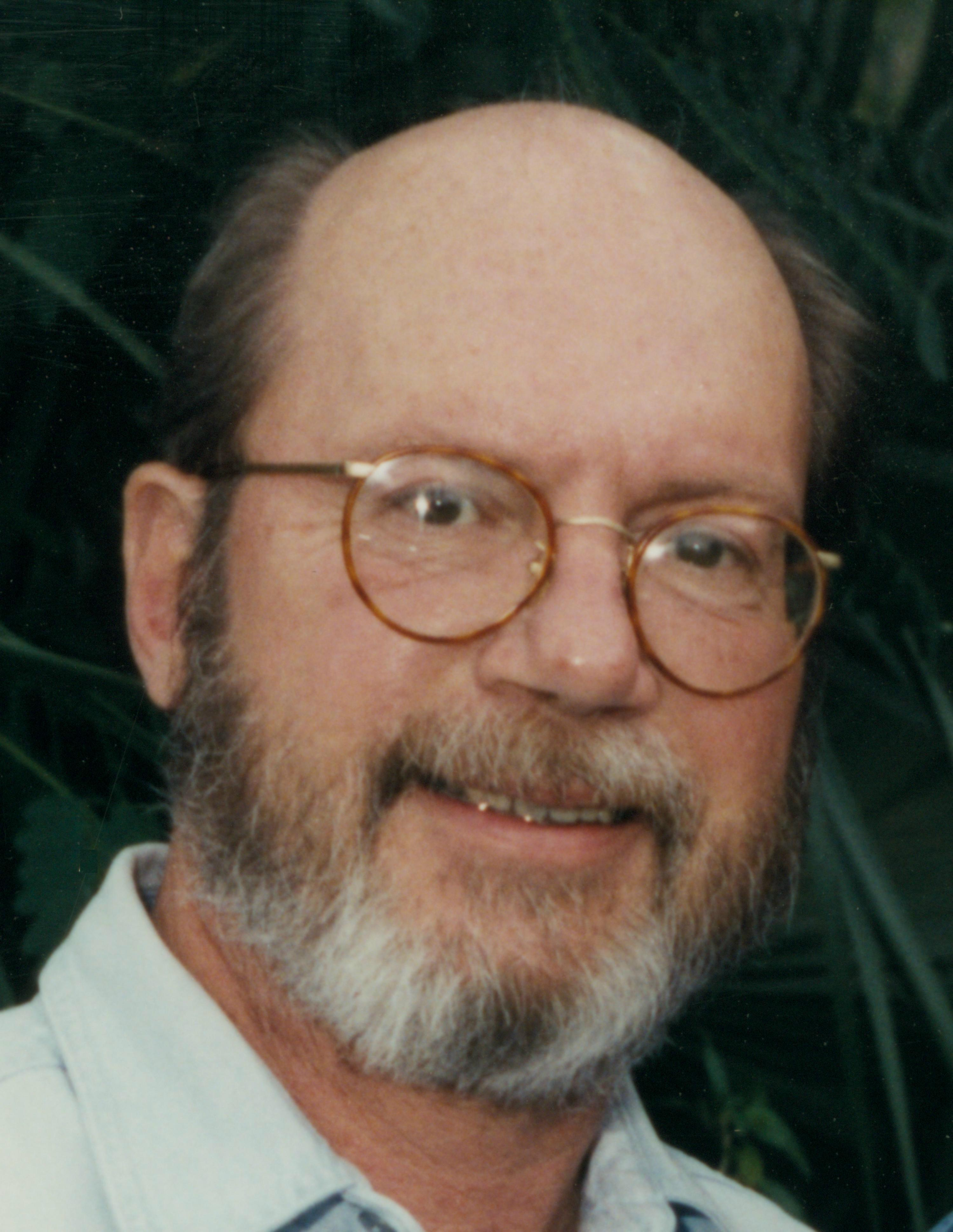
- Born: April 21, 1940; Philadelphia, Pennsylvania, U.S.
- Died: January 9, 2002 (aged 61); Coral Gables, Florida, U.S.
- Education: Penn State; Princeton
- Scientific career
- Fields: Physics
- Workplaces: Rosenstiel School of Marine, Atmospheric, and Earth Science at the University of Miami
- Doctoral advisor: Edward A. Frieman

Frederick Drach Tappert (April 21, 1940 – January 9, 2002) was an American physicist whose primary contributions were in underwater acoustics. He is noted for the development of the parabolic equation model and split-step Fourier algorithm for electromagnetic and ocean acoustic propagation.

== Early life and education ==
Tappert was born in April 1940, to Rev. Dr. Theodore Gerhardt Tappert and Helen Carson Tappert. As a child, Fred lived with his family on the campus of the Lutheran Theological Seminary in the Germantown section of Northwest Philadelphia. Growing up, his father "often mentioned the satisfaction that would result from the pursuit of knowledge for its own sake."

He attended Central High School in Philadelphia, and then Penn State University.

Tappert received his Ph.D. from Princeton University in 1967. His dissertation, entitled Kinetic theory of equilibrium plasmas, was supervised by Edward A. Frieman, then associate director of the Princeton Plasma Physics Laboratory.

== Career ==
=== Bell Telephone Labs ===
In 1967, he was hired as a technical staff member at Bell Telephone Labs, where he worked until 1974. At Bell Telephone Labs, he collaborated with Akira Hasegawa on optical solitons which underpinned later advances in fiber-optic communication technology.

=== New York University ===
Following Bell Labs, Tappert joined the Courant Institute at New York University as a senior research scientist, where he worked from 1974 to 1978.

=== University of Miami ===
In 1978, he joined the faculty of the University of Miami, where he held a joint appointment in the department of physics on the main campus and in the department of applied marine physics at the Rosenstiel School of Marine, Atmospheric, and Earth Science (RSMAS).

== Awards and recognition ==
In 2001, he was awarded the Department of the Navy's Superior Public Service Award, the citation of which noted, "Professor Tappert's introduction of the parabolic equation propagation model in 1974 started a revolution in the underwater acoustics modeling community...It is, in large part, a tribute to Professor Tappert's superb efforts that today the PE model is the de facto standard full wave propagation model in underwater acoustics and that, in a practical sense, he is thought of as the 'father of the PE model'."

Tappert was posthumously awarded the Pioneer in Underwater Acoustics Medal by the Acoustical Society of America, "for application of the parabolic equation to underwater acoustic propagation." The 145th Annual Meeting of the Acoustical Society, in 2003, featured a memorial session dedicated to Frederick Tappert on the subject of "Propagation Phenomena and the Parabolic Equation."
