= Kobe Women's Junior College =

Private women's junior college in Kobe, Hyōgo, Japan

Coordinates: 34°40′04″N 135°12′28″E

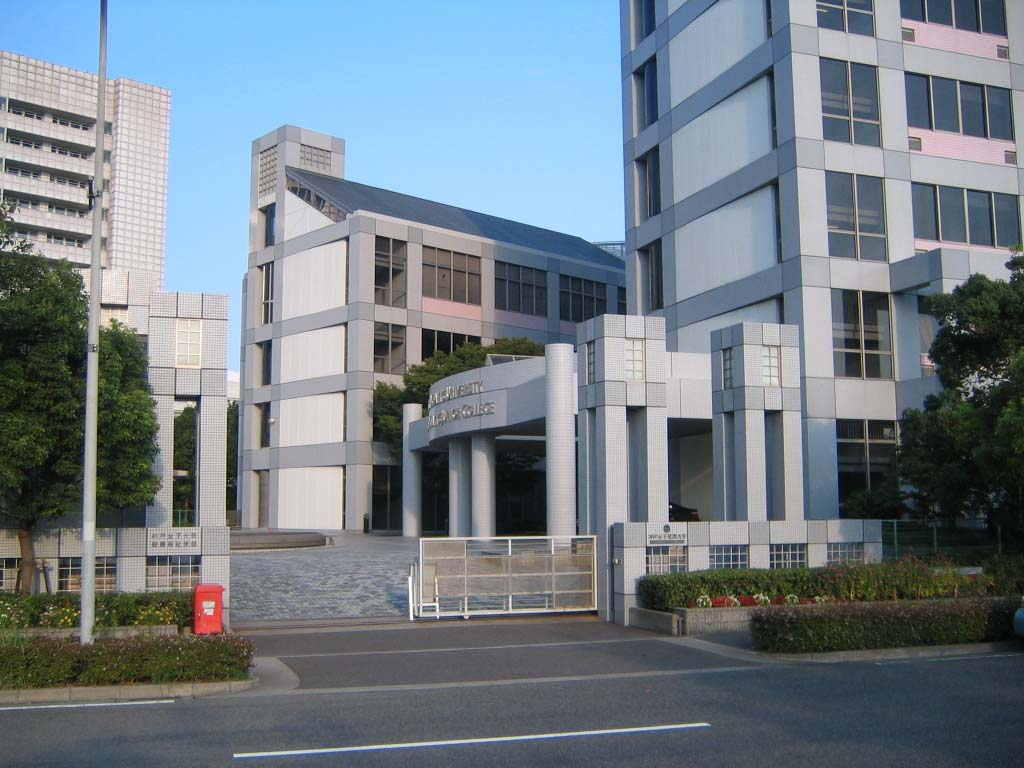

Kobe Women's Junior College (神戸女子短期大学, Kobe joshi tanki daigaku) is a private women's junior college in Kobe, Hyōgo, Japan, established in 1950.

== See also ==
- Kobe Women's University
