= Kobe Women's University =

Private women's college in Kobe, Japan

Coordinates: 34°39′29″N 135°06′32″E

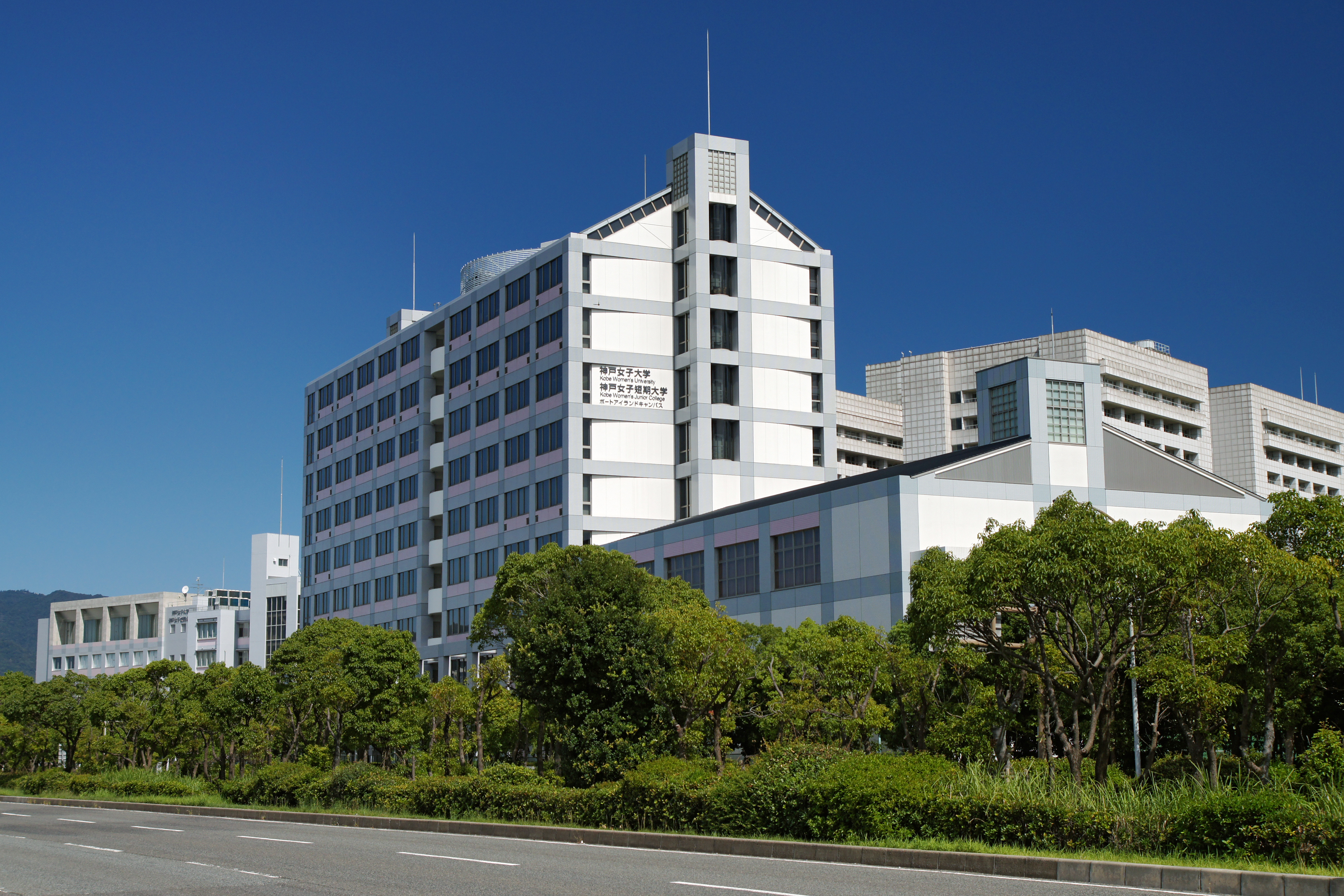
Port Island campus

Kobe Women's University (神戸女子大学, Kobe joshi daigaku) is a private women's college in Kobe, Hyōgo, Japan. The predecessor of the school was founded in 1940, and it was chartered as a university in 1966.

It has three campuses:

- in Sannomiya
- on Port Island
- in Suma (main campus)

== See also ==
- Kobe Women's Junior College
