= Zonal flow (plasma) =

Plasma flow

In toroidally confined fusion plasma experiments the term zonal flow means a plasma flow within a magnetic surface primarily in the poloidal direction. This usage is inspired by the analogy between the quasi-two-dimensional nature of large-scale atmospheric and oceanic flows, where zonal means latitudinal, and the similarly quasi-two-dimensional nature of low-frequency flows in a strongly magnetized plasma.

Zonal flows in the toroidal plasma context are further characterized by

- being localized in their radial extent transverse to the magnetic surfaces (in contrast to global plasma rotation),
- having little or no variation in either the poloidal or toroidal direction—they are m = n = 0 modes (where m and n are the poloidal and toroidal mode numbers, respectively),
- having zero real frequency when analyzed by linearization around an unperturbed toroidal equilibrium state (in contrast to the geodesic acoustic mode branch, which has finite frequency).
- Arising via a self-organization phenomenon driven by low-frequency drift-type modes, in which energy is transferred to longer wavelengths by modulational instability or turbulent inverse cascade.

== See also ==
- Zonal and poloidal
- Zonal flow
