= List of dynamical systems and differential equations topics =

This is a list of dynamical system and differential equation topics.

== Dynamical systems, in general ==
- Deterministic system (mathematics)
- Linear system
- Partial differential equation
- Dynamical systems and chaos theory
- Chaos theory
  - Chaos argument
  - Butterfly effect
  - 0-1 test for chaos
- Bifurcation diagram
- Feigenbaum constant
- Sharkovskii's theorem
- Attractor
  - Strange nonchaotic attractor
- Stability theory
  - Mechanical equilibrium
  - Astable
  - Monostable
  - Bistability
  - Metastability
- Feedback
  - Negative feedback
  - Positive feedback
  - Homeostasis
- Damping ratio
- Dissipative system
- Spontaneous symmetry breaking
- Turbulence
- Perturbation theory
- Control theory
  - Non-linear control
  - Adaptive control
  - Hierarchical control
  - Intelligent control
  - Optimal control
  - Dynamic programming
  - Robust control
  - Stochastic control
- System dynamics, system analysis
- Takens' theorem
- Exponential dichotomy
- Liénard's theorem
- Krylov–Bogolyubov theorem
- Krylov-Bogoliubov averaging method

== Abstract dynamical systems ==
- Measure-preserving dynamical system
- Ergodic theory
- Mixing (mathematics)
- Almost periodic function
- Symbolic dynamics
- Time scale calculus
- Arithmetic dynamics
- Sequential dynamical system
- Graph dynamical system
- Topological dynamical system

== Dynamical systems, examples ==
- List of chaotic maps
- Logistic map
- Lorenz attractor
- Lorenz-96
- Iterated function system
- Tetration
- Ackermann function
- Horseshoe map
- Hénon map
- Arnold's cat map
- Population dynamics

== Complex dynamics ==
- Fatou set
- Julia set
- Mandelbrot set

== Difference equations ==
- Recurrence relation
- Matrix difference equation
- Rational difference equation

== Ordinary differential equations: general ==
- Examples of differential equations
- Autonomous system (mathematics)
- Picard–Lindelöf theorem
- Peano existence theorem
- Carathéodory existence theorem
- Numerical ordinary differential equations
- Bendixson–Dulac theorem
- Gradient conjecture
- Recurrence plot
- Limit cycle
- Initial value problem
- Clairaut's equation
- Singular solution
- Poincaré–Bendixson theorem
- Riccati equations
- Functional differential equation

== Linear differential equations ==
- Exponential growth
  - Malthusian catastrophe
- Exponential response formula
- Simple harmonic motion
  - Phasor (physics)
  - RLC circuit
  - Resonance
    - Impedance
    - Reactance
    - Musical tuning
    - Orbital resonance
    - Tidal resonance
- Oscillator
  - Harmonic oscillator
  - Electronic oscillator
  - Floquet theory
  - Fundamental frequency
  - Oscillation (Vibration)
- Fundamental matrix (linear differential equation)
- Laplace transform applied to differential equations
- Sturm–Liouville theory
- Wronskian
- Loewy decomposition

== Mechanics ==
- Pendulum
  - Inverted pendulum
  - Double pendulum
  - Foucault pendulum
  - Spherical pendulum
- Kinematics
- Equation of motion
- Dynamics (mechanics)
- Classical mechanics
- Isolated physical system
  - Lagrangian mechanics
  - Hamiltonian mechanics
  - Routhian mechanics
  - Hamilton-Jacobi theory
  - Appell's equation of motion
  - Udwadia–Kalaba equation
  - Celestial mechanics
  - Orbit
- Lagrange point
  - Kolmogorov–Arnold–Moser theorem
  - N-body problem, many-body problem
- Ballistics

== Functions defined via an ODE ==
- Airy function
- Bessel function
- Legendre polynomials
- Hypergeometric function

== Rotating systems ==
- Angular velocity
- Angular momentum
- Angular acceleration
- Angular displacement
- Rotational invariance
- Rotational inertia
- Torque
- Rotational energy
- Centripetal force
- Centrifugal force
  - Centrifugal governor
- Coriolis force
- Axis of rotation
- Flywheel
  - Flywheel energy storage
  - Momentum wheel
- Spinning top
- Gyroscope
- Gyrocompass
- Precession
- Nutation

== Swarms ==
- Particle swarm optimization
- Self-propelled particles
- Swarm intelligence

== Stochastic dynamic equations ==
- Random walk
- Autoregressive process
- Unit root
- Moving average process
- Autoregressive–moving-average model
- Autoregressive integrated moving average
- Vector autoregressive model
- Stochastic differential equation
- Stochastic partial differential equation
