= Exponential response formula =

In mathematics, the exponential response formula (ERF), also known as exponential response and complex replacement, is a method used to find a particular solution of a non-homogeneous linear ordinary differential equation of any order. The exponential response formula is applicable to non-homogeneous linear ordinary differential equations with constant coefficients if the function is polynomial, sinusoidal, exponential or the combination of the three. The general solution of a non-homogeneous linear ordinary differential equation is a superposition of the general solution of the associated homogeneous ODE and a particular solution to the non-homogeneous ODE. Alternative methods for solving ordinary differential equations of higher order are method of undetermined coefficients and method of variation of parameters.

== Context and method ==
=== Applicability ===
The ERF method of finding a particular solution of a non-homogeneous differential equation is applicable if the non-homogeneous equation is or could be transformed to form $f(t)=B_1e^{\gamma_1 t}+B_2e^{\gamma_2 t} + \cdots + B_n e^{\gamma_n t}$; where $B, \gamma$ are real or complex numbers and $f(t)$ is homogeneous linear differential equation of any order. Then, the exponential response formula can be applied to each term of the right side of such equation. Due to linearity, the exponential response formula can be applied as long as the right side has terms, which are added together by the superposition principle.

=== Complex replacement ===
Complex replacement is a method of converting a non-homogeneous term of equation into a complex exponential function, which makes a given differential equation a complex exponential.

Consider differential equation $y''+ y = \cos(t)$.

To make complex replacement, Euler's formula can be used;

$$\begin{align}
\cos(t) &= \operatorname{Re}(e^{i t}) = \operatorname{Re}(\cos(t)+i \sin(t)) \\
\sin(t) &= \operatorname{Im}(e^{i t}) = \operatorname{Im}(\cos(t)+i \sin(t))
\end{align}$$

Therefore, given differential equation changes to $z''+ z = e^{it}$. The solution of the complex differential equation can be found as $z(t)$, from which the real part is the solution of the original equation.

Complex replacement is used for solving differential equations when the non-homogeneous term is expressed in terms of a sinusoidal function or an exponential function, which can be converted into a complex exponential function differentiation and integration. Such complex exponential function is easier to manipulate than the original function.

When the non-homogeneous term is expressed as an exponential function, the ERF method or the undetermined coefficients method can be used to find a particular solution. If non-homogeneous terms can not be transformed to complex exponential function, then the Lagrange method of variation of parameters can be used to find solutions.

=== Linear time-invariant operator ===
The differential equations are important in simulating natural phenomena. In particular, there are numerous phenomena described as high order linear differential equations, for example the spring vibration, LRC circuit, beam deflection, signal processing, control theory and LTI systems with feedback loops.

Mathematically, the system is time-invariant if whenever the input $f(t)$ has response $x(t)$ then for any constant "a", the input $f(t - a)$ has response $x(t - a)$. Physically, time invariance means system’s response does not depend on what time the input begins. For example, if a spring-mass system is at equilibrium, it will respond to a given force in the same way, no matter when the force was applied.

When the time-invariant system is also linear, it is called a linear time-invariant system (LTI system). Most of these LTI systems are derived from linear differential equations, where the non-homogeneous term is called the input signal and solution of the non-homogeneous equations is called the response signal. If the input signal is given exponentially, the corresponding response signal also changes exponentially.

Considering the following $n$th order linear differential equation

$$a_n \frac{d^n y}{dt^n}+a_{n-1}\frac{d^{n-1}y}{dt^{n-1}}+ \cdots +a_1 \frac{dy}{dt}+a_0 y = f(t) \qquad \qquad \quad (1)$$

and denoting

$$L = a_n D^n+a_{n-1}D^{n-1}+ \cdots +a_1 D^1 +a_0 I,$$
$$D^k = \frac{d^k}{dt^k} (k =1,2,\ldots,n),$$

where $a_0,\ldots,a_n$ are the constant coefficients, produces differential operator $L$, which is linear and time-invariant and known as the LTI operator. The operator, $L$ is obtained from its characteristic polynomial;

$$P(s)=a_n s^n+a_{n-1}s^{n-1}+\cdots+a_0$$

by formally replacing the indeterminate s here with the differentiation operator $D$

$$L=P(D)$$
$$P(D) = a_n D^n+a_{n-1}D^{n-1}+\cdots+a_0 I$$

Therefore, the equation (1) can be written as

$$P(D)y=f(t) \qquad \qquad \qquad \qquad \qquad \qquad \qquad \qquad \qquad (2)$$

=== Problem setting and ERF method ===
Considering LTI differential equation above, with exponential input $f(t) = Be^{\gamma t}$, where $B$ and $\gamma$ are given numbers. Then, a particular solution is

$y_p = \frac{B e^{\gamma t}}{P(\gamma)} \qquad$

provide only that $P(\gamma)\neq 0$.

Proof: Due to linearity of operator $P(D)$, the equation can be written as

$$P(D)(y_p)= P(D)\left( \frac{B e^{\gamma t}}{P(\gamma)}\right)=\frac{B}{P(\gamma)} P(D)(e^{\gamma t}) \qquad \qquad (3)$$

On the other hand, since

$$P(D) \left (e^{\gamma t} \right ) = P(\gamma) e^{\gamma t},$$

substituting this into equation (3), produces

$$P(D)(y_p)= P(D) \left( \frac{B e^{\gamma t}}{P(\gamma)}\right)=\frac{B}{P(\gamma)} P(D) \left(e^{\gamma t} \right) = \frac{B}{P(\gamma)} P(\gamma) e^{\gamma t} = B e^{\gamma t}.$$

Therefore, $y_p$ is a particular solution to the non-homogeneous differential equation.

Thus, the above equation for a particular response $y_p$ is called the exponential response formula (ERF) for the given exponential input.

In particular, in case of $P(\gamma) = 0$, a solution to equation (2) is given by

$$y_p = \frac{Bte^{\gamma t}}{P'(\gamma)}, \qquad P'(\gamma) \neq 0$$

and is called the resonant response formula.

== Example ==
Let's find the particular solution to 2nd order linear non-homogeneous ODE;

$$2x''+x'+x = 1 + 2e^t + e^{-t}\cos(t).$$

The characteristic polynomial is $P(s) = 2s^2+s+1$. Also, the non-homogeneous term, $f(t) = 1+2e^t+e^{-t}\cos(t)$ can be written as follows

$$f(t) = f_1(t)+f_2(t)+f_3(t), f_1(t) = 1, f_2(t) = 2e^t, f_3(t)=e^{-t}\cos(t).$$

Then, the particular solutions corresponding to $f_1(t), f_2(t)$ and $f_3(t)$, are found, respectively.

First, considering non-homogeneous term, $f_1(t)=1$. In this case, since $f_1(t)=1=e^{0 \cdot t}, \gamma = 0$ and $P(\gamma) = P(0) = 1 \neq 0$.

from the ERF, a particular solution corresponding to $f_1(t)$ can be found.

$$x_{1p} = \frac{f_1(t)}{P(0)} = \frac{1}{1} = 1$$.

Similarly, a particular solution can be found corresponding to $f_2(t)$.

$$x_{2p} = \frac{f_2(t)}{P(1)} = \frac{2e^t}{4} = \frac{e^t}{2}.$$

Let's find a particular solution to DE corresponding to 3rd term;

$$2x''+x'+x = e^{-t}\cos(t).$$

In order to do this, equation must be replaced by complex-valued equation, of which it is the real part:

$$2z''+z'+z = e^{(-1+i)t}.$$

Applying the exponential response formula (ERF), produces

$$\begin{align}
z_p &= \frac{e^{(-1+i)t}}{P(-1+i)} \\
&=\frac{ie^{(-1+i)t}}{3} && P(-1+i)=2(-1+i)^2+(-1+i)+1=-3i
\end{align}$$

and the real part is

$$x_{3p}=-\frac{1}{3}e^{-t}\sin(t).$$

Therefore, the particular solution of given equation, $x_p$ is

$$x_p=x_{1p}+x_{2p}+x_{3p}=1+\frac{e^t}{2}-\frac{1}{3}e^{-t}\sin(t).$$

== Comparison with method of undetermined coefficients ==
The undetermined coefficients method is a method of appropriately selecting a solution type according to the form of the non-homogeneous term and determining the undetermined constant, so that it satisfies the non-homogeneous equation. On the other hand, the ERF method obtains a special solution based on differential operator. Similarity for both methods is that special solutions of non-homogeneous linear differential equations with constant coefficients are obtained, while form of the equation in consideration is the same in both methods.

For example, finding a particular solution of $y''+y=e^t$ with the method of undetermined coefficients requires solving the characteristic equation $\lambda^2 + 1=0, \lambda = \pm i$. The non-homogeneous term $f(t)=Be^{\gamma t}, B=1, \gamma = 1$ is then considered and since $\gamma =1$ is not a characteristic root, it puts a particular solution in form of $y_p(t) = Ae^{\gamma t}$, where $A$ is undetermined constant. Substituting into the equation to determine the tentative constant yields

$$\lambda^2 A e^{\lambda t}+Ae^{\lambda t} = e^{\lambda t}$$

therefore

$$A = \frac{1}{\lambda^2+1}.$$

The particular solution can be found in form:

$$y_p(t) = Ae^{\lambda t} = \frac{e^{\lambda t}}{\lambda^2+1}.$$

On the other hand, the exponential response formula method requires characteristic polynomial $P(s)=s^2+1$ to be found, after which the non-homogeneous terms $f(t)=Be^{\gamma t}, B=1, \gamma = 1$ is complex replaced. The particular solution is then found using formula

$$y_p(t) = \frac{e^{\lambda t}}{P(\lambda)}= \frac{e^{\lambda t}}{\lambda^2+1}.$$

== Generalized exponential response formula ==
The exponential response formula method was discussed in case of $P(\gamma ) \neq 0$. In the case of $P(\gamma ) = 0, P'(\gamma ) \neq 0$, the resonant response formula is also considered.

In the case of $P(\gamma)=P'(\gamma)=\cdots=P^{(k-1)}(\gamma)=0, P^k(\gamma)\neq 0$, we will discuss how the ERF method will be described in this section.

Let $P(D)$ be a polynomial operator with constant coefficients, and $P^{(m)}$ its $m$-th derivative. Then ODE

$P(D)y = Be^{\gamma t}$, where $\gamma$ is real or complex.

has the particular solution as following.

- $P(\gamma)\neq 0$. In this case, a particular solution will be given by $y_p(t)=\tfrac{Be^{\gamma t}}{P(\gamma)}$.(exponent response formula)
- $P(\gamma)=0$ but $P'(\gamma)\neq 0$. In this case, a particular solution will be given by $y_p(t) =\tfrac{Bte^{\gamma t}}{P'(\gamma)}$.(resonant response formula)
- $P(\gamma)=P'(\gamma)=\cdots=P^{(k-1)}(\gamma)=0$ but $P^k(\gamma)\neq 0$. In this case, a particular solution will be given by

$y_p(t)=\frac{Bt^k e^{\gamma t}}{P^{(k)}(\gamma)}, k=2,\ldots,m$

Above equation is called generalized exponential response formula.

=== Example ===
To find a particular solution of the following ODE;

$$y'''-3y'+2y = 6e^t.$$

the characteristic polynomial is $P(s) = s^3-3s+2$.

By the calculating, we get the following:

$$P(1)=0,P'(1)=0, P''(1)=6 \neq 0.$$

Original exponential response formula is not applicable to this case due to division by zero. Therefore, using the generalized exponential response formula and calculated constants, particular solution is

$$y_p(t)=\frac{6t^2 e^t}{P''(1)}=\frac{6t^2 e^t}6 = t^2 e^t.$$

== Application examples ==
=== Motion of object hanging from a spring ===
Object hanging from a spring with displacement $d$. The force acting is gravity, spring force, air resistance, and any other external forces.

From Hooke’s law, the motion equation of object is expressed as follows;

$$m \frac{d^2 x}{dt^2}+r\frac{dx}{dt}+kx = F(t),$$

where $F(t)$ is external force.

Now, assuming drag is neglected and $F(t) = F_0\cos(\omega t)$, where $\omega =\sqrt{\tfrac{k}{m}}$ (the external force frequency coincides with the natural frequency). Therefore, the harmonic oscillator with sinusoidal forcing term is expressed as following:

$$m \frac{d^2 x}{dt^2}+kx = F(t).$$

Then, a particular solution is

$$x_p = \frac{F_0}{2\sqrt{km}}t\sin(\omega t).$$

Applying complex replacement and the ERF: if $z_p$ is a solution to the complex DE

$$m \frac{d^2 z}{dt^2}+kz = F_0 e^{i\omega t},$$

then $x_p=\operatorname{Re}(z_p)$ will be a solution to the given DE.

The characteristic polynomial is $P(s) = m s^2+k$, and $\gamma = i\omega$, so that $P(\gamma) = 0$. However, since $P'(s) = 2ms$, then $P'(\gamma)=P'(i\omega)=2m\omega i \neq 0$. Thus, the resonant case of the ERF gives

$$\begin{align}
y_p & = \operatorname{Re}\left( \frac{F_0 te^{i\omega t}}{P'(\gamma)}\right) \\[4pt]
&= \operatorname{Re}\left( \frac{F_0 t(\cos(\omega t)+i\sin(\omega t))}{2mi\omega}\right) \\[4pt]
& = \operatorname{Re}\left( \frac{-F_0 t(i\cos(\omega t)-\sin(\omega t))}{2m\omega}\right) \\[4pt]
& = \frac{F_0 t \sin(\omega t)}{2m\omega} \\[4pt]
&=\frac{F_0}{2\sqrt{km}}t\sin(\omega t).
\end{align}$$

=== Electrical circuits ===
Considering the electric current flowing through an electric circuit, consisting of a resistance ($R$), a capacitor ($C$), a coil wires ($L$), and a battery ($E$), connected in series.

This system is described by an integral-differential equation found by Kirchhoff called Kirchhoff’s voltage law, relating the resistor $R$, capacitor $C$, inductor $L$, battery $E$, and the current $I$ in a circuit as follows,

$$LI'(t)+RI(t)+\frac 1 C \int_{t_0}^t I(s) \, ds = \int_{t_0}^t E(s)\,ds$$

Differentiating both sides of the above equation, produces the following ODE.

$$LI''(t)+RI'(t)+\frac{1}{C} I(t) = E(t)$$

Now, assuming $E(t)=E_0\sin(\omega_0 t)$, where $\omega_0=\sqrt{\tfrac{1}{LC}}$. ($\omega_0$ is called resonance frequency in LRC circuit). Under above assumption, the output (particular solution) corresponding to input $E(t)$ can be found. In order to do it, given input can be converted in complex form:

$$E(t)=E_0 \sin(\omega_0 t) = \operatorname{Im}(E_0 e^{i \omega_0 t})$$

The characteristic polynomial is $P(s) = Ls^2+Rs+\frac{1}{s}$, where $P(i\omega_0)=i\omega_0 R\neq 0$. Therefore, from the ERF, a particular solution can be obtained as follows;

$$\begin{align}
I_p & = \operatorname{Im} \left( \frac{E_0 e^{i\omega_0 t}}{P(i\omega_0)} \right)  \\
&= \operatorname{Im} \left( \frac{E_0 e^{i\omega_0 t}}{i\omega_0 R} \right) \\
&= \operatorname{Im} \left( \frac{-E_0(i\cos(\omega_0 t)-\sin(\omega_0 t))}{\omega_0 R} \right) \\[4pt]
& = \frac{-E_0 \cos(\omega_0 t)}{\omega_0 R}
\end{align}$$

=== Complex gain and phase lag ===
Considering the general LTI system

$$P(D)x = Q(D)f(t)$$

where $f(t)$ is the input and $P(D), Q(D)$ are given polynomial operators, while assuming that $P(s)\neq 0$. In case that $f(r) = F_0\cos(\omega t)$, a particular solution to given equation is

$$x_p(t) = \operatorname{Re}\left ( F_0 \frac{Q(i\omega)}{P(i\omega)}e^{i\omega t}\right).$$

Considering the following concepts used in physics and signal processing mainly.

- The amplitude of the input is $F_0$. This has the same units as the input quantity.
- The angular frequency of the input is $\omega$. It has units of radians/time. Often it will be referred to it as frequency, even though technically frequency should have units of cycles/time.
- The amplitude of the response is $A = F_0|Q(i\omega)/P(i\omega)|$. This has the same units as the response quantity.
- The gain is $g(\omega) = |Q(i\omega)/P (i\omega)|$. The gain is the factor that the input amplitude is multiplied by to get the amplitude of the response. It has the units needed to convert input units to output units.
- The phase lag is $\phi = -\operatorname{Arg}(Q(i\omega)/P(i\omega))$. The phase lag has units of radians, i.e. it’s dimensionless.
- The time lag is $\phi/ \omega$. This has units of time. It is the time that peak of the output lags behind that of the input.
- The complex gain is $Q(i\omega)/P(i\omega)$. This is the factor that the complex input is multiplied by to get the complex output.
