= Exponential shift =

Exponential shift may refer to:

- Exponential shift theorem, a shift theorem about polynomial differential operators and exponential function in mathematics
- Exponent shift, a display function in engineering or scientific notation on some calculators
