= Source term =

Source term can refer to:

- A measure of radioactive contamination
- One of the terms in a linear differential equation, especially a wave equation
- The release parameters (e.g. magnitude, rate, duration, orientation, temperature) that are the initial conditions for determining the consequences of the loss event for a hazardous material and/or energy release to the surroundings. For vapor dispersion modeling, it is the estimation, based on the release specification, of the actual cloud conditions of temperature, aerosol content, density, size, velocity and mass to be input into the dispersion model.
