= Homogeneous system =

Homogeneous system:

- Homogeneous system of linear algebraic equations
- System of homogeneous differential equations
  - System of homogeneous first-order differential equations
  - System of homogeneous linear differential equations
- Homogeneous system in physics
