= Annihilator method =

Method of solving non-homogeneous ordinary differential equations

In mathematics, the annihilator method is a procedure used to find a particular solution to certain types of non-homogeneous ordinary differential equations (ODEs). It is similar to the method of undetermined coefficients, but instead of guessing the particular solution in the method of undetermined coefficients, the particular solution is determined systematically in this technique. The phrase undetermined coefficients can also be used to refer to the step in the annihilator method in which the coefficients are calculated.

The annihilator method is used as follows. Given the ODE $P(D)y=f(x)$, find another differential operator $A(D)$ such that $A(D)f(x) = 0$. This operator is called the annihilator, hence the name of the method. Applying $A(D)$ to both sides of the ODE gives a homogeneous ODE $\big(A(D)P(D)\big)y = 0$ for which we find a solution basis $\{y_1,\ldots,y_n\}$ as before. Then the original inhomogeneous ODE is used to construct a system of equations restricting the coefficients of the linear combination to satisfy the ODE.

This method is not as general as variation of parameters in the sense that an annihilator does not always exist.

== Annihilator table ==
f(x)	A(D)
$a_n x^n + a_{n-1} x^{n-1} + \cdots + a_1 x + a_0 \!$	$D^{n+1} \!$
$e^{a x}\!$	$D-a\!$
$x^k.e^{a x}\!$	$(D-a)^{k+1}\!$
$\cos(b x) \;\;\mathrm{or}\;\;\sin(b x) \!$	$D^2+b^2 \!$
$x^k \cos(b x) \;\;\mathrm{or}\;\;x^k \sin(b x) \!$	$(D^2+b^2)^{k+1} \!$
$e^{a x} \cos(b x) \;\;\mathrm{or}\;\;e^{a x} \sin(b x) \!$	$(D-a)^2+b^2 = D^2 - 2 a D + a^2 + b^2\!$
$x^k e^{a x} \cos(b x) \;\;\mathrm{or}\;\;x^k e^{a x} \sin(b x) \!$	$\left[ (D-a)^2+b^2 \right] ^ {k+1} = \left[ D^2 - 2 a D + a^2 + b^2\right] ^ {k+1} \!$
$a_n x^n + \cdots + a_1 x + a_0 + b_1 e^{\pm c_1 x} + \cdots + b_k e^{\mp c_k x}\!$	$D^{n+1}(D \mp c_1). \cdots . (D \pm c_k) \!$

Where $k$ is in the natural numbers, and $k, b, a, c_1, \cdots, c_k$ are in the real numbers.

If $f(x)$ consists of the sum of the expressions given in the table, the annihilator is the product of the corresponding annihilators.

== Example ==
Given $y''-4y'+5y=\sin(kx)$, $P(D)=D^2-4D+5$. The simplest annihilator of $\sin(kx)$ is $A(D)=D^2+k^2$. The zeros of $A(z)P(z)$ are $\{2+i,2-i,ik,-ik\}$, so the solution basis of $A(D)P(D)$ is $\{y_1,y_2,y_3,y_4\}=\{e^{(2+i)x},e^{(2-i)x},e^{ikx},e^{-ikx}\}.$

Setting $y=c_1y_1+c_2y_2+c_3y_3+c_4y_4$ we find

$$\begin{align}
\sin(kx) & = P(D)y \\[8pt]
& = P(D)(c_1y_1+c_2y_2+c_3y_3+c_4y_4) \\[8pt]
& =c_1P(D)y_1+c_2P(D)y_2+c_3P(D)y_3+c_4P(D)y_4 \\[8pt]
& =0+0+c_3(-k^2-4ik+5)y_3+c_4(-k^2+4ik+5)y_4 \\[8pt]
& =c_3(-k^2-4ik+5)(\cos(kx)+i\sin(kx))
+c_4(-k^2+4ik+5)(\cos(kx)-i\sin(kx))
\end{align}$$

giving the system

$$i=(k^2+4ik-5)c_3+(-k^2+4ik+5)c_4$$
$$0=(k^2+4ik-5)c_3+(k^2-4ik-5)c_4$$

which has solutions

$c_3=\frac i{2(k^2+4ik-5)}$, $c_4=\frac i{2(-k^2+4ik+5)}$

giving the solution set

$$\begin{align}
y & = c_1y_1+c_2y_2+\frac i{2(k^2+4ik-5)}y_3+\frac i{2(-k^2+4ik+5)}y_4 \\[8pt]
& =c_1y_1+c_2y_2+\frac{4k\cos(kx)-(k^2-5)\sin(kx)}{(k^2+4ik-5)(k^2-4ik-5)} \\[8pt]
& =c_1y_1+c_2y_2+\frac{4k\cos(kx)+(5-k^2)\sin(kx)}{k^4+6k^2+25}.
\end{align}$$

This solution can be broken down into the homogeneous and nonhomogeneous parts. In particular, $y_p = \frac{4k\cos(kx)+(5-k^2)\sin(kx)}{k^4+6k^2+25}$ is a particular integral for the nonhomogeneous differential equation, and $y_c = c_1y_1 + c_2y_2$ is a complementary solution to the corresponding homogeneous equation. The values of $c_1$ and $c_2$ are determined usually through a set of initial conditions. Since this is a second-order equation, two such conditions are necessary to determine these values.

The fundamental solutions $y_1 = e^{(2+i)x}$ and $y_2 = e^{(2-i)x}$ can be further rewritten using Euler's formula:

$$e^{(2+i)x} = e^{2x} e^{ix} = e^{2x} (\cos x + i \sin x)$$

$$e^{(2-i)x} = e^{2x} e^{-ix} = e^{2x} (\cos x - i \sin x)$$

Then $c_1 y_1 + c_2 y_2 = c_1e^{2x} (\cos x + i \sin x) + c_2 e^{2x} (\cos x - i \sin x) = (c_1 + c_2) e^{2x} \cos x + i(c_1 - c_2) e^{2x} \sin x$, and a suitable reassignment of the constants gives a simpler and more understandable form of the complementary solution, $y_c = e^{2x} (c_1 \cos x + c_2 \sin x)$.
