= Exact Equation =

In mathematics, the term exact equation can refer either of the following:

- Exact differential equation
- Exact differential form
