= Inexact differential equation =

Solvable form of differential equation

An inexact differential equation is a differential equation of the form:

$$M(x,y) \, dx+N(x,y) \, dy=0$$

satisfying the condition

$$\frac{\partial M}{\partial y} \ne \frac{\partial N}{\partial x}$$

Leonhard Euler invented the integrating factor in 1739 to solve these equations.

== Solution method ==
To solve an inexact differential equation, it may be transformed into an exact differential equation by finding an integrating factor $\mu$. Multiplying the original equation by the integrating factor gives:

$$\mu M\,dx+\mu N\,dy=0$$.

For this equation to be exact, $\mu$ must satisfy the condition:

$$\frac{\partial\mu M}{\partial y}=\frac{\partial\mu N}{\partial x}$$.

Expanding this condition gives:

$$M\mu_y-N\mu_x+(M_y-N_x)\mu = 0.$$

Since this is a partial differential equation, it is generally difficult. However in some cases where $\mu$ depends only on $x$ or $y$, the problem reduces to a separable first-order linear differential equation. The solutions for such cases are:

$$\mu(y)=e^{\int{\frac{N_x-M_y}{M} \, dy}}$$

or

$$\mu(x)=e^{\int{\frac{M_y-N_x}{N} \, dx}}.$$

== See also ==
- Inexact differential
- Exact differential equation
