= Exact differential equation =

Type of differential equation subject to a particular solution methodology

In mathematics, an exact differential equation or total differential equation is a certain kind of ordinary differential equation which is widely used in physics and engineering.

== Definition ==
Given a simply connected and open subset D of $\mathbb{R}^2$ and two functions I and J which are continuous on D, an implicit first-order ordinary differential equation of the form

$$I(x, y)\, dx + J(x, y)\, dy = 0,$$

is called an exact differential equation if there exists a continuously differentiable function F, called the potential function, so that

$$\frac{\partial F}{\partial x} = I$$

and

$$\frac{\partial F}{\partial y} = J.$$

An exact equation may also be presented in the following form:

$$I(x, y) + J(x, y) \, y'(x) = 0$$

where the same constraints on I and J apply for the differential equation to be exact.

The nomenclature of "exact differential equation" refers to the exact differential of a function. For a function $F(x_0, x_1,...,x_{n-1},x_n)$, the exact or total derivative with respect to $x_0$ is given by

$$\frac{dF}{dx_0}=\frac{\partial F}{\partial x_0}+\sum_{i=1}^{n}\frac{\partial F}{\partial x_i}\frac{dx_i}{dx_0}.$$

=== Example ===
The function $F:\mathbb{R}^{2}\to\mathbb{R}$ given by

$$F(x,y) = \frac{1}{2}(x^2 + y^2)+c$$

is a potential function for the differential equation

$$x\,dx + y\,dy = 0.\,$$

== First-order exact differential equations ==
=== Identifying first-order exact differential equations ===
Let the functions $M$, $N$, $M_y$, and $N_x$, where the subscripts denote the partial derivative with respect to the relative variable, be continuous in the region $R: \alpha < x < \beta, \gamma < y < \delta$. Then the differential equation

$M(x, y) + N(x, y)\frac{dy}{dx} = 0$

is exact if and only if

$M_y(x, y) = N_x(x, y)$

That is, there exists a function $\psi(x, y)$, called a potential function, such that

$\psi _x(x, y) = M(x, y) \text{ and } \psi_y(x, y) = N(x, y)$

So, in general:

$$M_y(x, y) = N_x(x, y) \iff
\begin{cases}
\exists \psi(x, y)\\
\psi_x(x, y) = M(x, y)\\
\psi_y(x, y) = N(x, y)
\end{cases}$$

==== Proof ====
The proof has two parts.

First, suppose there is a function $\psi(x,y)$ such that $\psi_x(x, y) = M(x, y) \text{ and } \psi_y(x, y) = N(x, y)$

It then follows that $M_y(x, y) = \psi _{xy}(x, y) \text{ and } N_x(x, y) = \psi _{yx}(x, y)$

Since $M_y$ and $N_x$ are continuous, then $\psi _{xy}$ and $\psi _{yx}$ are also continuous which guarantees their equality.

The second part of the proof involves the construction of $\psi(x, y)$ and can also be used as a procedure for solving first-order exact differential equations. Suppose that $M_y(x, y) = N_x(x, y)$ and let there be a function $\psi(x, y)$ for which $\psi _x(x, y) = M(x, y) \text{ and } \psi _y(x, y) = N(x, y)$

Begin by integrating the first equation with respect to $x$. In practice, it doesn't matter if you integrate the first or the second equation, so long as the integration is done with respect to the appropriate variable.

$$\frac{\partial \psi}{\partial x}(x, y) = M(x, y)$$
$$\psi(x, y) = \int M(x, y) \, dx + h(y)$$
$$\psi(x, y) = Q(x, y) + h(y)$$

where $Q(x, y)$ is any differentiable function such that $Q_x = M$. The function $h(y)$ plays the role of a constant of integration, but instead of just a constant, it is a function of $y$, since $M$ is a function of both $x$ and $y$ and we are only integrating with respect to $x$.

Now to show that it is always possible to find an $h(y)$ such that $\psi _y = N$.
$$\psi(x, y) = Q(x, y) + h(y)$$

Differentiate both sides with respect to $y$.
$$\frac{\partial \psi}{\partial y}(x, y) = \frac{\partial Q}{\partial y}(x, y) + h'(y)$$

Set the result equal to $N$ and solve for $h'(y)$.
$$h'(y) = N(x, y) - \frac{\partial Q}{\partial y}(x, y)$$

In order to determine $h'(y)$ from this equation, the right-hand side must depend only on $y$. This can be proven by showing that its derivative with respect to $x$ is always zero, so differentiate the right-hand side with respect to $x$.
$$\frac{\partial N}{\partial x}(x, y) - \frac{\partial}{\partial x}\frac{\partial Q}{\partial y}(x, y) \iff \frac{\partial N}{\partial x}(x, y) - \frac{\partial}{\partial y}\frac{\partial Q}{\partial x}(x, y)$$

Since $Q_x = M$,
$$\frac{\partial N}{\partial x}(x, y) - \frac{\partial M}{\partial y}(x, y)$$
Now, this is zero based on our initial supposition that $M_y(x, y) = N_x(x, y)$

Therefore,
$$h'(y) = N(x, y) - \frac{\partial Q}{\partial y}(x, y)$$
$$h(y) = \int{\left(N(x, y) - \frac{\partial Q}{\partial y}(x, y)\right) dy}$$

$$\psi(x, y) = Q(x, y) + \int \left(N(x, y) - \frac{\partial Q}{\partial y}(x, y)\right) \, dy + C$$

And this completes the proof.

=== Solutions to first-order exact differential equations ===
First-order exact differential equations of the form
$$M(x, y) + N(x, y)\frac{dy}{dx} = 0$$

can be written in terms of the potential function $\psi(x, y)$
$$\frac{\partial \psi}{\partial x} + \frac{\partial \psi}{\partial y}\frac{dy}{dx} = 0$$

where
$$\begin{cases}
\psi _x(x, y) = M(x, y)\\
\psi _y(x, y) = N(x, y)
\end{cases}$$

This is equivalent to taking the total derivative of $\psi(x,y)$.
$$\frac{\partial \psi}{\partial x} + \frac{\partial \psi}{\partial y}\frac{dy}{dx} = 0 \iff \frac{d}{dx}\psi(x, y(x)) = 0$$

The solutions to an exact differential equation are then given by
$$\psi(x, y(x)) = c$$

and the problem reduces to finding $\psi(x, y)$.

This can be done by integrating the two expressions $M(x, y) \, dx$ and $N(x, y) \, dy$ and then writing down each term in the resulting expressions only once and summing them up in order to get $\psi(x, y)$.

The reasoning behind this is the following. Since
$$\begin{cases}
\psi _x(x, y) = M(x, y)\\
\psi _y(x, y) = N(x, y)
\end{cases}$$

it follows, by integrating both sides, that
$$\begin{cases}
\psi(x, y) = \int M(x, y) \, dx + h(y) = Q(x, y) + h(y)\\
\psi(x, y) = \int N(x, y) \, dy + g(x) = P(x, y) + g(x)
\end{cases}$$

Therefore,
$$Q(x, y) + h(y) = P(x, y) + g(x)$$

where $Q(x, y)$ and $P(x, y)$ are differentiable functions such that $Q_x = M$ and $P_y = N$.

In order for this to be true and for both sides to result in the exact same expression, namely $\psi(x, y)$, then $h(y)$ must be contained within the expression for $P(x, y)$ because it cannot be contained within $g(x)$, since it is entirely a function of $y$ and not $x$ and is therefore not allowed to have anything to do with $x$. By analogy, $g(x)$ must be contained within the expression $Q(x, y)$.

Ergo,
$$Q(x, y) = g(x) + f(x, y) \text{ and } P(x, y) = h(y) + d(x, y)$$

for some expressions $f(x, y)$ and $d(x, y)$. Plugging in into the above equation, we find that
$$g(x) + f(x, y) + h(y) = h(y) + d(x, y) + g(x) \Rightarrow f(x, y) = d(x, y)$$
and so $f(x, y)$ and $d(x, y)$ turn out to be the same function. Therefore,
$$Q(x, y) = g(x) + f(x, y) \text { and } P(x, y) = h(y) + f(x, y)$$

Since we already showed that
$$\begin{cases}
\psi(x, y) = Q(x, y) + h(y)\\
\psi(x, y) = P(x, y) + g(x)
\end{cases}$$

it follows that
$$\psi(x, y) = g(x) + f(x, y) + h(y)$$

So, we can construct $\psi(x, y)$ by doing $\int M(x,y) \, dx$ and $\int N(x, y) \, dy$ and then taking the common terms we find within the two resulting expressions (that would be $f(x, y)$ ) and then adding the terms which are uniquely found in either one of them – $g(x)$ and $h(y)$.

== Second-order exact differential equations ==
The concept of exact differential equations can be extended to second-order equations. Consider starting with the first-order exact equation:

$$I(x,y)+J(x,y){dy \over dx}=0$$

Since both functions $I(x,y)$, $J(x,y)$ are functions of two variables, implicitly differentiating the multivariate function yields

$${dI \over dx} +\left({ dJ\over dx}\right){dy \over dx}+{d^2y \over dx^2} (J(x,y))=0$$

Expanding the total derivatives gives that

$${dI \over dx}={\partial I\over\partial x}+{\partial I\over\partial y}{dy \over dx}$$

and that

$${dJ \over dx}={\partial J\over\partial x}+{\partial J\over\partial y}{dy \over dx}$$

Combining the ${dy \over dx}$ terms gives

$${\partial I\over\partial x}+{dy \over dx}\left({\partial I\over\partial y}+{\partial J\over\partial x}+{\partial J\over\partial y}{dy \over dx}\right)+{d^2y \over dx^2} (J(x,y))=0$$

If the equation is exact, then ${\partial J\over\partial x}={\partial I\over\partial y}$. Additionally, the total derivative of $J(x,y)$ is equal to its implicit ordinary derivative ${dJ \over dx}$. This leads to the rewritten equation

$${\partial I\over\partial x}+{dy \over dx}\left({\partial J\over\partial x}+{dJ \over dx}\right)+{d^2y \over dx^2} (J(x,y))=0$$

Now, let there be some second-order differential equation

$$f(x,y)+g\left(x,y,{dy \over dx}\right){dy \over dx}+{d^2y \over dx^2} (J(x,y))=0$$

If ${\partial J\over\partial x}={\partial I\over\partial y}$ for exact differential equations, then

$$\int \left({\partial I\over\partial y}\right) \, dy=\int \left({\partial J\over\partial x}\right) \, dy$$

and

$$\int \left({\partial I\over\partial y}\right) \, dy=\int \left({\partial J\over\partial x}\right) \, dy=I(x,y)-h(x)$$

where $h(x)$ is some arbitrary function only of $x$ that was differentiated away to zero upon taking the partial derivative of $I(x,y)$ with respect to $y$. Although the sign on $h(x)$ could be positive, it is more intuitive to think of the integral's result as $I(x,y)$ that is missing some original extra function $h(x)$ that was partially differentiated to zero.

Next, if

$${dI\over dx}={\partial I\over\partial x}+{\partial I\over\partial y}{dy \over dx}$$

then the term ${\partial I\over\partial x}$ should be a function only of $x$ and $y$, since partial differentiation with respect to $x$ will hold $y$ constant and not produce any derivatives of $y$. In the second-order equation

$$f(x,y)+g\left(x,y,{dy \over dx}\right){dy \over dx}+{d^2y \over dx^2} (J(x,y))=0$$

only the term $f(x,y)$ is a term purely of $x$ and $y$. Let ${\partial I\over\partial x} = f(x,y)$. If ${\partial I\over\partial x}=f(x,y)$, then

$$f(x,y)={ dI\over dx}-{\partial I\over\partial y}{dy \over dx}$$

Since the total derivative of $I(x,y)$ with respect to $x$ is equivalent to the implicit ordinary derivative ${dI \over dx}$ , then

$$f(x,y)+{\partial I\over\partial y}{dy \over dx}={dI \over dx}={d \over dx}(I(x,y)-h(x))+{dh(x) \over dx}$$

So,

$${dh(x) \over dx}=f(x,y)+{\partial I\over\partial y}{dy \over dx}-{d \over dx}(I(x,y)-h(x))$$

and

$$h(x) =\int\left(f(x,y)+{\partial I\over\partial y}{dy \over dx}-{d \over dx}(I(x,y)-h(x))\right) \, dx$$

Thus, the second-order differential equation

$$f(x,y)+g\left(x,y,{dy \over dx}\right){dy \over dx}+{d^2y \over dx^2} (J(x,y))=0$$

is exact only if $g\left(x,y,{dy \over dx}\right)={ dJ\over dx}+{\partial J\over\partial x}={dJ \over dx}+{\partial J\over\partial x}$ and only if the below expression

$$\int\left(f(x,y)+{\partial I\over\partial y}{dy \over dx}-{d \over dx} (I(x,y)-h(x)) \right) \, dx=\int \left(f(x,y)-{\partial \left(I(x,y)-h(x)\right)\over\partial x}\right) \, dx$$

is a function solely of $x$. Once $h(x)$ is calculated with its arbitrary constant, it is added to $I(x,y)-h(x)$ to make $I(x,y)$. If the equation is exact, then we can reduce to the first-order exact form which is solvable by the usual method for first-order exact equations.

$$I(x,y)+J(x,y){dy \over dx}=0$$

Now, however, in the final implicit solution there will be a $C_1x$ term from integration of $h(x)$ with respect to $x$ twice as well as a $C_2$, two arbitrary constants as expected from a second-order equation.

=== Example ===
Given the differential equation

$$(1-x^2)y''-4xy'-2y=0$$

one can always easily check for exactness by examining the $y''$ term. In this case, both the partial and total derivative of $1-x^2$ with respect to $x$ are $-2x$, so their sum is $-4x$, which is exactly the term in front of $y'$. With one of the conditions for exactness met, one can calculate that

$$\int (-2x) \, dy=I(x,y)-h(x)=-2xy$$

Letting $f(x,y)=-2y$, then

$$\int \left(-2y-2xy'-{d \over dx} (-2xy)\right) \, dx=\int (-2y-2xy'+2xy'+2y) \, dx=\int (0) \, dx = h(x)$$

So, $h(x)$ is indeed a function only of $x$ and the second-order differential equation is exact. Therefore, $h(x)=C_1$ and $I(x,y)=-2xy+C_1$. Reduction to a first-order exact equation yields

$$-2xy+C_1+(1-x^2)y'=0$$

Integrating $I(x,y)$ with respect to $x$ yields

$$-x^2y+C_1x+i(y)=0$$

where $i(y)$ is some arbitrary function of $y$. Differentiating with respect to $y$ gives an equation correlating the derivative and the $y'$ term.

$$-x^2+i'(y)=1-x^2$$

So, $i(y)=y+C_2$ and the full implicit solution becomes

$$C_1x+C_2+y-x^2y=0$$

Solving explicitly for $y$ yields

$$y= \frac{C_1x+C_2}{1-x^2}$$

== Higher-order exact differential equations ==
The concepts of exact differential equations can be extended to any order. Starting with the exact second-order equation

$${d^2y \over dx^2}(J(x,y))+{dy \over dx}\left({dJ \over dx}+{\partial J\over\partial x}\right)+f(x,y)=0$$

it was previously shown that equation is defined such that

$$f(x,yt)={dht(x) \over dx}+{d \over dx}(I(x,y)-h(x))-{\partial J\over\partial x}{dy \over dx}$$

Implicit differentiation of the exact second-order equation $n$ times will yield an $(n+2)$th-order differential equation with new conditions for exactness that can be readily deduced from the form of the equation produced. For example, differentiating the above second-order differential equation once to yield a third-order exact equation gives the following form

$${d^3y \over dx^3}(J(x,y))+{d^2y \over dx^2}{dJ \over dx}+{d^2y \over dx^2}\left({dJ \over dx}+{\partial J\over\partial x}\right)+{dy \over dx}\left({d^2J \over dx^2}+{d \over dx}\left({\partial J\over\partial x}\right)\right)+{df(x,y) \over dx}=0$$

where

$${df(x,y) \over dx}={d^2h(x) \over dx^2}+{d^2 \over dx^2} (I(x,y)-h(x))-{d^2y \over dx^2}{\partial J\over\partial x}-{dy \over dx}{d \over dx}\left({\partial J\over\partial x}\right)=F\left(x,y,{dy \over dx}\right)$$

and where $F\left(x,y,{dy \over dx}\right)$ is a function only of $x,y$ and ${dy \over dx}$. Combining all ${dy \over dx}$ and ${d^2y \over dx^2}$ terms not coming from $F\left(x,y,{dy \over dx}\right)$ gives

$${d^3y \over dx^3}(J(x,y))+{d^2y \over dx^2}\left(2{dJ \over dx}+{\partial J\over\partial x}\right)+{dy \over dx}\left({d^2J \over dx^2}+{d \over dx}\left({\partial J\over\partial x}\right)\right)+F\left(x,y,{dy \over dx}\right)=0$$

Thus, the three conditions for exactness for a third-order differential equation are: the ${d^2y \over dx^2}$ term must be $2{dJ \over dx}+{\partial J\over\partial x}$, the ${dy \over dx}$ term must be ${d^2J \over dx^2}+{d \over dx}\left({\partial J\over\partial x}\right)$ and

$$F\left(x,y,{dy \over dx}\right)-{d^2 \over dx^2} (I(x,y)-h(x))+{d^2y \over dx^2}{\partial J\over\partial x}+{dy \over dx}{d \over dx}\left({\partial J\over\partial x}\right)$$

must be a function solely of $x$.

=== Example ===
Consider the nonlinear third-order differential equation

$$yy'''+3y'y''+12x^2=0$$

If $J(x,y)=y$, then $y''\left(2{dJ \over dx}+{\partial J\over\partial x}\right)$ is $2y'y''$ and $y'\left({d^2J \over dx^2}+{d \over dx}\left({\partial J\over\partial x}\right)\right)=y'y''$which together sum to $3y'y''$. Fortunately, this appears in our equation. For the last condition of exactness,

$$F\left(x,y,{dy \over dx}\right)-{d^2 \over dx^2}\left(I(x,y)-h(x)\right)+{d^2y \over dx^2}{\partial J\over\partial x}+{dy \over dx}{d \over dx}\left({\partial J\over\partial x}\right)=12x^2-0+0+0=12x^2$$

which is indeed a function only of $x$. So, the differential equation is exact. Integrating twice yields that $h(x)=x^4+C_1x+C_2=I(x,y)$. Rewriting the equation as a first-order exact differential equation yields

$$x^4+C_1x+C_2+yy'=0$$

Integrating $I(x,y)$ with respect to $x$ gives that ${x^5\over 5}+C_1x^2+C_2x+i(y)=0$. Differentiating with respect to $y$ and equating that to the term in front of $y'$ in the first-order equation gives that $i'(y)=y$ and that $i(y)={y^2\over 2}+C_3$. The full implicit solution becomes

$${x^5\over 5}+C_1x^2+C_2x+C_3+{y^2\over 2}=0$$

The explicit solution, then, is

$$y=\pm\sqrt{C_1x^2+C_2x+C_3-\frac{2x^5}{5}}$$

== See also ==
- Exact differential
- Inexact differential equation
