= Laplace transform applied to differential equations =

Method for solving linear differential equations using the Laplace transform

In mathematics, the Laplace transform is a powerful integral transform used to switch a function from the time domain to the s-domain. The Laplace transform can be used in some cases to solve linear differential equations with given initial conditions.

== Approach ==
First consider the following property of the Laplace transform:

$$\mathcal{L}\{f'\}=s\mathcal{L}\{f\}-f(0)$$

$$\mathcal{L}\{f''\}=s^2\mathcal{L}\{f\}-sf(0)-f'(0)$$

One can prove by induction that

$$\mathcal{L}\{f^{(n)}\}=s^n\mathcal{L}\{f\}-\sum_{i=1}^{n}s^{n-i}f^{(i-1)}(0)$$

Now we consider the following differential equation:

$$\sum_{i=0}^{n}a_if^{(i)}(t)=\phi(t)$$

with given initial conditions

$$f^{(i)}(0)=c_i$$

Using the linearity of the Laplace transform it is equivalent to rewrite the equation as

$$\sum_{i=0}^{n}a_i\mathcal{L}\{f^{(i)}(t)\}=\mathcal{L}\{\phi(t)\}$$

obtaining

$$\mathcal{L}\{f(t)\}\sum_{i=0}^{n}a_is^i-\sum_{i=1}^{n}\sum_{j=1}^{i}a_is^{i-j}f^{(j-1)}(0)=\mathcal{L}\{\phi(t)\}$$

Solving the equation for $\mathcal{L}\{f(t)\}$ and substituting $f^{(i)}(0)$ with $c_i$ one obtains

$$\mathcal{L}\{f(t)\}=\frac{\mathcal{L}\{\phi(t)\}+\sum_{i=1}^{n}\sum_{j=1}^{i}a_is^{i-j}c_{j-1}}{\sum_{i=0}^{n}a_is^i}$$

The solution for f(t) is obtained by applying the inverse Laplace transform to $\mathcal{L}\{f(t)\}.$

Note that if the initial conditions are all zero, i.e.

$$f^{(i)}(0)=c_i=0\quad\forall i\in\{0,1,2,...\ n\}$$

then the formula simplifies to

$$f(t)=\mathcal{L}^{-1}\left\{{\mathcal{L}\{\phi(t)\}\over\sum_{i=0}^{n}a_is^i}\right\}$$

== An example ==
We want to solve

$$f''(t)+4f(t)=\sin(2t)$$

with initial conditions f(0) = 0 and f′(0)=0.

We note that

$$\phi(t)=\sin(2t)$$

and we get

$$\mathcal{L}\{\phi(t)\}=\frac{2}{s^2+4}$$

The equation is then equivalent to

$$s^2\mathcal{L}\{f(t)\}-sf(0)-f'(0)+4\mathcal{L}\{f(t)\}=\mathcal{L}\{\phi(t)\}$$

We deduce

$$\mathcal{L}\{f(t)\}=\frac{2}{(s^2+4)^2}$$

Now we apply the Laplace inverse transform to get

$$f(t)=\frac{1}{8}\sin(2t)-\frac{t}{4}\cos(2t)$$

== Bibliography ==
- A. D. Polyanin, Handbook of Linear Partial Differential Equations for Engineers and Scientists, Chapman & Hall/CRC Press, Boca Raton, 2002. ISBN 1-58488-299-9
