= Shift theorem =

In mathematics, the (exponential) shift theorem is a theorem about polynomial differential operators (D-operators) and exponential functions. It permits one to eliminate, in certain cases, the exponential from under the D-operators.

== Statement ==
The theorem states that, if P(D) is a polynomial of the D-operator, then, for any sufficiently differentiable function y,

$$P(D)(e^{ax}y)\equiv e^{ax}P(D+a)y.$$

To prove the result, proceed by induction. Note that only the special case

$$P(D)=D^n$$

needs to be proved, since the general result then follows by linearity of D-operators.

The result is clearly true for n = 1 since

$$D(e^{ax}y)=e^{ax}(D+a)y.$$

Now suppose the result true for n = k, that is,

$$D^k(e^{ax}y)=e^{ax}(D+a)^k y.$$

Then,

$$\begin{align}
D^{k+1}(e^{ax}y)&\equiv\frac{d}{dx}\left\{e^{ax}\left(D+a\right)^ky\right\}\\
&{}=e^{ax}\frac{d}{dx}\left\{\left(D+a\right)^k y\right\} + ae^{ax}\left\{\left(D+a\right)^ky\right\}\\
&{}=e^{ax}\left\{\left(\frac{d}{dx}+a\right) \left(D+a\right)^ky\right\}\\
&{}=e^{ax}(D+a)^{k+1}y.
\end{align}$$

This completes the proof.

The shift theorem can be applied equally well to inverse operators:

$$\frac{1}{P(D)}(e^{ax}y)=e^{ax}\frac{1}{P(D+a)}y.$$

== Related ==
There is a similar version of the shift theorem for Laplace transforms ($t<a$):

$$e^{-as}\mathcal{L}\{f(t)\} = \mathcal{L}\{f(t-a)\}.$$

== Examples ==
The exponential shift theorem can be used to speed the calculation of higher derivatives of functions that is given by the product of an exponential and another function. For instance, if $f(x) = \sin(x) e^x$, one has that

$$\begin{align}
D^3 f &= D^3 (e^x\sin(x)) = e^x (D+1)^3 \sin (x) \\
&= e^x \left(D^3 + 3D^2 + 3D + 1\right) \sin(x) \\
&= e^x\left(-\cos(x)-3\sin(x)+3\cos(x)+\sin(x)\right)
\end{align}$$

Another application of the exponential shift theorem is to solve linear differential equations whose characteristic polynomial has repeated roots.
