= Variation of parameters =

Procedure for solving differential equations

In mathematics, variation of parameters, also known as variation of constants, is a general method to solve inhomogeneous linear ordinary differential equations.

For first-order inhomogeneous linear differential equations it is usually possible to find solutions via integrating factors or undetermined coefficients with considerably less effort, although those methods leverage heuristics that involve guessing and do not work for all inhomogeneous linear differential equations.

Variation of parameters extends to linear partial differential equations as well, specifically to inhomogeneous problems for linear evolution equations like the heat equation, wave equation, and vibrating plate equation. In this setting, the method is more often known as Duhamel's principle, named after Jean-Marie Duhamel (1797–1872) who first applied the method to solve the inhomogeneous heat equation. Sometimes variation of parameters itself is called Duhamel's principle and vice versa.

== History ==
The method of variation of parameters was first sketched by the Swiss mathematician Leonhard Euler (1707–1783), and later completed by the Italian-French mathematician Joseph-Louis Lagrange (1736–1813).

A forerunner of the method of variation of a celestial body's orbital elements appeared in Euler's work in 1748, while he was studying the mutual perturbations of Jupiter and Saturn. In his 1749 study of the motions of the earth, Euler obtained differential equations for the orbital elements. In 1753, he applied the method to his study of the motions of the moon.

Lagrange first used the method in 1766. Between 1778 and 1783, he further developed the method in two series of memoirs: one on variations in the motions of the planets and another on determining the orbit of a comet from three observations. During 1808–1810, Lagrange gave the method of variation of parameters its final form in a third series of papers.

== Description of method ==
Given an ordinary non-homogeneous linear differential equation of order n

$y^{(n)}(x) + \sum_{i=0}^{n-1} a_i(x) y^{(i)}(x) = b(x).$	i

Let $y_1(x), \ldots, y_n(x)$ be a basis of the vector space of solutions of the corresponding homogeneous equation

$y^{(n)}(x) + \sum_{i=0}^{n-1} a_i(x) y^{(i)}(x) = 0.$	ii

Then a particular solution to the non-homogeneous equation is given by

$y_p(x) = \sum_{i=1}^{n} c_i(x) y_i(x)$	iii

where the $c_i(x)$ are differentiable functions which are assumed to satisfy the conditions

$\sum_{i=1}^n c_i'(x) y_i^{(j)}(x) = 0, \quad j = 0,\ldots, n-2.$	iv

Starting with (iii), repeated differentiation combined with repeated use of (iv) gives

$y_p^{(j)}(x) = \sum_{i=1}^{n} c_i(x) y_i^{(j)}(x), \quad j=0,\ldots,n-1 \, .$	v

One last differentiation gives

$y_p^{(n)}(x)=\sum_{i=1}^n c_i'(x)y_i^{(n-1)}(x)+\sum_{i=1}^n c_i(x) y_i^{(n)}(x) \, .$	vi

By substituting (iii) into (i) and applying (v) and (vi) it follows that

$\sum_{i=1}^n c_i'(x) y_i^{(n-1)}(x) = b(x).$	vii

The linear system (iv and vii) of n equations can then be solved using Cramer's rule yielding

$$c_i'(x) = \frac{W_i(x)}{W(x)}, \, \quad i=1,\ldots,n$$

where $W(x)$ is the Wronskian determinant of the basis $y_1(x), \ldots, y_n(x)$ and $W_i(x)$ is the Wronskian determinant of the basis with the i-th column replaced by $(0, 0, \ldots, b(x)).$

The particular solution to the non-homogeneous equation can then be written as

$$\sum_{i=1}^n y_i(x) \, \int \frac{W_i(x)}{W(x)}\, \mathrm dx.$$

== Intuitive explanation ==
Consider the equation of the forced dispersionless spring, in suitable units:

$$x''(t) + x(t) = F(t).$$

Here x is the displacement of the spring from the equilibrium x = 0, and F(t) is an external applied force that depends on time. When the external force is zero, this is the homogeneous equation (whose solutions are linear combinations of sines and cosines, corresponding to the spring oscillating with constant total energy).

We can construct the solution physically, as follows. Between times $t=s$ and $t=s+ds$, the momentum corresponding to the solution has a net change $F(s)\,ds$ (see: Impulse (physics)). A solution to the inhomogeneous equation, at the present time t > 0, is obtained by linearly superposing the solutions obtained in this manner, for s going between 0 and t.

The homogeneous initial-value problem, representing a small impulse $F(s)\,ds$ being added to the solution at time $t=s$, is

$$x''(t)+x(t)=0,\quad x(s)=0,\ x'(s)=F(s)\,ds.$$

The unique solution to this problem is easily seen to be $x(t) = F(s)\sin(t-s)\,ds$. The linear superposition of all of these solutions is given by the integral:

$$x(t) = \int_0^t F(s)\sin(t-s)\,ds.$$

To verify that this satisfies the required equation:

$$x'(t)=\int_0^t F(s)\cos(t-s)\,ds$$
$$x''(t) = F(t) - \int_0^tF(s)\sin(t-s)\,ds = F(t)-x(t),$$

as required (see: Leibniz integral rule).

The general method of variation of parameters allows for solving an inhomogeneous linear equation

$$Lx(t)=F(t)$$

by means of considering the second-order linear differential operator L to be the net force, thus the total impulse imparted to a solution between time s and s+ds is F(s)ds. Denote by $x_s$ the solution of the homogeneous initial value problem

$$Lx(t)=0, \quad x(s)=0,\ x'(s)=F (s)\,ds.$$

Then a particular solution of the inhomogeneous equation is

$$x (t)=\int_0^t x_s (t)\,ds,$$

the result of linearly superposing the infinitesimal homogeneous solutions. There are generalizations to higher order linear differential operators.

In practice, variation of parameters usually involves the fundamental solution of the homogeneous problem, the infinitesimal solutions $x_s$ then being given in terms of explicit linear combinations of linearly independent fundamental solutions. In the case of the forced dispersionless spring, the kernel $\sin(t-s)=\sin t\cos s - \sin s\cos t$ is the associated decomposition into fundamental solutions.

== Examples ==
=== First-order equation ===
$$y' + p(x)y = q(x)$$

The complementary solution to our original (inhomogeneous) equation is the general solution of the corresponding homogeneous equation (written below):

$$y' + p(x)y = 0$$

This homogeneous differential equation can be solved by different methods, for example separation of variables:

$$\frac{d}{dx} y + p(x)y = 0$$

$$\frac{dy}{dx}=-p(x)y$$

$${dy \over y} = -{p(x)\,dx},$$

$$\int \frac{1}{ y} \, dy = -\int p(x) \, dx$$

$$\ln |y| = -\int p(x) \, dx + C$$

$$y = \pm e^{-\int p(x) \, dx +C } = C_0 e^{-\int p(x) \, dx}$$

The complementary solution to our original equation is therefore:

$$y_c = C_0 e^{-\int p(x) \, dx}$$

Now we return to solving the non-homogeneous equation:

$$y' + p(x)y = q(x)$$

Using the method variation of parameters, the particular solution is formed by multiplying the complementary solution by an unknown function C(x):

$$y_p = C(x) e^{-\int p(x) \, dx}$$

By substituting the particular solution into the non-homogeneous equation, we can find C(x):

$$C' (x) e^{-\int p(x) \, dx} - C(x) p(x) e^{-\int p(x) \, dx} + p(x) C(x) e^{-\int p(x) \, dx} = q(x)$$

$$C' (x) e^{-\int p(x) \, dx} = q(x)$$

$$C' (x) = q(x) e^{\int p(x) \, dx}$$

$$C(x) =\int q(x) e^{\int p(x) \, dx} \, dx + C_1$$

We only need a single particular solution, so we arbitrarily select $C_1=0$ for simplicity. Therefore the particular solution is:

$$y_p =e^{-\int p(x) \, dx} \int q(x) e^{\int p(x) \, dx} \, dx$$

The final solution of the differential equation is:

$$\begin{align}
y &= y_c + y_p\\
&=C_0 e^{-\int p(x) \, dx} + e^{-\int p(x) \, dx} \int q(x) e^{\int p(x) \, dx} \, dx
\end{align}$$

This recreates the method of integrating factors.

=== Specific second-order equation ===
Let us solve

$$y''+4y'+4y = \cosh x$$

We want to find the general solution to the differential equation, that is, we want to find solutions to the homogeneous differential equation

$$y''+4y'+4y=0.$$

The characteristic equation is:

$$\lambda^2+4\lambda+4=(\lambda+2)^2=0$$

Since $\lambda=-2$ is a repeated root, we have to introduce a factor of x for one solution to ensure linear independence: $u_1 = e^{-2x}$ and $u_2 =x e^{-2x}$. The Wronskian of these two functions is

$$W=\begin{vmatrix}
e^{-2x} & xe^{-2x} \\
-2e^{-2x} & -e^{-2x}(2x-1)\\
\end{vmatrix} = -e^{-2x}e^{-2x}(2x-1)+2xe^{-2x}e^{-2x} = e^{-4x}.$$

Because the Wronskian is non-zero, the two functions are linearly independent, so this is in fact the general solution for the homogeneous differential equation (and not a mere subset of it).

We seek functions $A(x)$ and $B(x)$ so $A(x) u_1(x)+B(x) u_2(x)$ is a particular solution of the non-homogeneous equation. We need only calculate the integrals

$$A(x) = - \int {1\over W} u_2(x) b(x)\,\mathrm dx,\; B(x) = \int {1 \over W} u_1(x)b(x)\,\mathrm dx$$

Recall that for this example

$$b(x) = \cosh x$$

That is,

$$A(x) = - \int {1\over e^{-4x}} xe^{-2x} \cosh x \,\mathrm dx = - \int xe^{2x}\cosh x \,\mathrm dx = -{1\over 18}e^x\left(9(x-1)+e^{2x}(3x-1)\right)+C_1$$
$$B(x) = \int {1 \over e^{-4x}} e^{-2x} \cosh x \,\mathrm dx = \int e^{2x}\cosh x\,\mathrm dx ={1\over 6}e^x\left(3+e^{2x}\right)+C_2$$

where $C_1$ and $C_2$ are constants of integration.

=== General second-order equation ===
We have a differential equation of the form

$$u''+p(x)u'+q(x)u=f(x)$$

and we define the linear operator

$$L=D^2+p(x)D+q(x)$$

where D represents the differential operator. We therefore have to solve the equation $L u(x)=f(x)$ for $u(x)$, where $L$ and $f(x)$ are known.

We must solve first the corresponding homogeneous equation:

$$u''+p(x)u'+q(x)u=0$$

by the technique of our choice. Once we've obtained two linearly independent solutions to this homogeneous differential equation (because this ODE is second-order) — call them u_{1} and u_{2} — we can proceed with variation of parameters.

Now, we seek the general solution to the differential equation $u_G(x)$ which we assume to be of the form

$$u_G(x)=A(x)u_1(x)+B(x)u_2(x).$$

Here, $A(x)$ and $B(x)$ are unknown and $u_1(x)$ and $u_2(x)$ are the solutions to the homogeneous equation. (Observe that if $A(x)$ and $B(x)$ are constants, then $Lu_G(x)=0$.) Since the above is only one equation and we have two unknown functions, it is reasonable to impose a second condition. We choose the following:

$$A'(x)u_1(x)+B'(x)u_2(x)=0.$$

Now,

$$\begin{align}
u_G'(x) &= \left (A(x)u_1(x)+B(x)u_2(x) \right )' \\
&= \left (A(x)u_1(x) \right )'+ \left (B(x)u_2(x) \right )'\\
&=A'(x)u_1(x)+A(x)u_1'(x)+B'(x)u_2(x)+B(x)u_2'(x)\\
&=A'(x)u_1(x)+B'(x)u_2(x)+A(x)u_1'(x)+B(x)u_2'(x) \\
&= A(x)u_1'(x)+B(x)u_2'(x)
\end{align}$$

Differentiating again (omitting intermediary steps)

$$u_G''(x)=A(x)u_1''(x)+B(x)u_2''(x)+A'(x)u_1'(x)+B'(x)u_2'(x).$$

Now we can write the action of L upon u_{G} as

$$Lu_G=A(x)Lu_1(x)+B(x)Lu_2(x)+A'(x)u_1'(x)+B'(x)u_2'(x).$$

Since u_{1} and u_{2} are solutions, then

$$Lu_G=A'(x)u_1'(x)+B'(x)u_2'(x).$$

We have the system of equations

$$\begin{bmatrix}
u_1(x)  & u_2(x) \\
u_1'(x) & u_2'(x) \end{bmatrix}
\begin{bmatrix}
A'(x) \\
B'(x)\end{bmatrix} =
\begin{bmatrix} 0 \\ f \end{bmatrix}.$$

Expanding,

$$\begin{bmatrix}
A'(x)u_1(x)+B'(x)u_2(x)\\
A'(x)u_1'(x)+B'(x)u_2'(x) \end{bmatrix}
= \begin{bmatrix} 0\\f\end{bmatrix}.$$

So the above system determines precisely the conditions

$$A'(x)u_1(x)+B'(x)u_2(x)=0.$$
$$A'(x)u_1'(x)+B'(x)u_2'(x)=Lu_G=f.$$

We seek A(x) and B(x) from these conditions, so, given

$$\begin{bmatrix}
u_1(x)  & u_2(x) \\
u_1'(x) & u_2'(x)
\end{bmatrix}
\begin{bmatrix}
A'(x) \\
B'(x)\end{bmatrix} =
\begin{bmatrix}
0\\
f\end{bmatrix}$$

we can solve for (A′(x), B′(x))^{T}, so

$$\begin{bmatrix} A'(x) \\ B'(x) \end{bmatrix} =
\begin{bmatrix}
u_1(x)  & u_2(x) \\
u_1'(x) & u_2'(x)
\end{bmatrix}^{-1}
\begin{bmatrix} 0\\ f \end{bmatrix} =\frac{1}{W} \begin{bmatrix}
u_2'(x)  & -u_2(x) \\
-u_1'(x) & u_1(x) \end{bmatrix}
\begin{bmatrix} 0\\ f \end{bmatrix},$$

where W denotes the Wronskian of u_{1} and u_{2}. (We know that W is nonzero, from the assumption that u_{1} and u_{2} are linearly independent.) So,

$$\begin{align}
A'(x) &= - {1\over W} u_2(x) f(x), & B'(x) &= {1 \over W} u_1(x)f(x) \\
A(x)  &= - \int {1\over W} u_2(x) f(x)\,\mathrm dx, & B(x) &= \int {1 \over W} u_1(x)f(x)\,\mathrm dx
\end{align}$$

While homogeneous equations are relatively easy to solve, this method allows the calculation of the coefficients of the general solution of the inhomogeneous equation, and thus the complete general solution of the inhomogeneous equation can be determined.

Note that $A(x)$ and $B(x)$ are each determined only up to an arbitrary additive constant (the constant of integration). Adding a constant to $A(x)$ or $B(x)$ does not change the value of $Lu_G(x)$ because the extra term is just a linear combination of u_{1} and u_{2}, which is a solution of $L$ by definition.

== See also ==
- Alekseev–Gröbner formula, a generalization of the variation of constants formula
- Reduction of order
