= List of things named after Joseph Liouville =

Several concepts from mathematics and physics are named after the French mathematician Joseph Liouville.

- Euler–Liouville equation
- Liouville–Arnold theorem
- Liouville–Bratu–Gelfand equation
- Liouville–Green method
- Liouville's equation
- Liouville's formula
- Liouville function
- Liouville dynamical system
- Liouville field theory
- Liouville gravity
- Liouville integrability
- Liouville measure
- Liouville number
- Liouville one-form
- Liouville operator
- Liouville space
- Liouville surface
- Liouville–Neumann series
- Liouvillian function
- Riemann–Liouville integral
- Quantum Liouville equation
- Sturm–Liouville theory

== Liouville's theorem ==
- Liouville's theorem (complex analysis)
- Liouville's theorem (harmonic functions)
- Liouville's theorem (conformal mappings)
- Liouville's theorem (differential algebra)
- Liouville's theorem (diophantine approximation)
- Liouville's theorem (Hamiltonian)
