= Liouville–Bratu–Gelfand equation =

Non-linear partial differential equation

For Liouville's equation in differential geometry, see Liouville's equation.

In mathematics, Liouville–Bratu–Gelfand equation or Liouville's equation is a non-linear Poisson equation, named after the mathematicians Joseph Liouville, Gheorghe Bratu and Israel Gelfand. The equation reads

$$\nabla^2 \psi + \lambda e^\psi = 0$$

The equation appears in thermal runaway as Frank-Kamenetskii theory, astrophysics for example, Emden–Chandrasekhar equation. This equation also describes space charge of electricity around a glowing wire and describes planetary nebula.

== Liouville's solution ==
In two dimension with Cartesian Coordinates $(x,y)$, Joseph Liouville proposed a solution in 1853 as

$$\lambda e^\psi (u^2 + v^2 + 1) ^2 = 2 \left[\left(\frac{\partial u}{\partial x}\right)^2 + \left(\frac{\partial u}{\partial y}\right)^2\right]$$

where $f(z)=u + i v$ is an arbitrary analytic function with $z=x+iy$. In 1915, G.W. Walker found a solution by assuming a form for $f(z)$. If $r^2=x^2+y^2$, then Walker's solution is

$$8 e^{-\psi} = \lambda \left[\left(\frac{r}{a}\right)^n + \left(\frac{a}{r}\right)^n\right]^2$$

where $a$ is some finite radius. This solution decays at infinity for any $n$, but becomes infinite at the origin for $n<1$ , becomes finite at the origin for $n=1$ and becomes zero at the origin for $n>1$. Walker also proposed two more solutions in his 1915 paper.

== Radially symmetric forms ==
If the system to be studied is radially symmetric, then the equation in $n$ dimension becomes

$$\psi'' + \frac{n-1}{r}\psi' + \lambda e^\psi=0$$

where $r$ is the distance from the origin. With the boundary conditions

$$\psi'(0)=0, \quad \psi(1) = 0$$

and for $\lambda\geq 0$, a real solution exists only for $\lambda \in [0,\lambda_c]$, where $\lambda_c$ is the critical parameter called as Frank-Kamenetskii parameter. The critical parameter is $\lambda_c=0.8785$ for $n=1$, $\lambda_c=2$ for $n=2$ and $\lambda_c=3.32$ for $n=3$. For $n=1, \ 2$, two solution exists and for $3\leq n\leq 9$ infinitely many solution exists with solutions oscillating about the point $\lambda=2(n-2)$. For $n\geq 10$, the solution is unique and in these cases the critical parameter is given by $\lambda_c=2(n-2)$. Multiplicity of solution for $n=3$ was discovered by Israel Gelfand in 1963 and in later 1973 generalized for all $n$ by Daniel D. Joseph and Thomas S. Lundgren.

The solution for $n=1$ that is valid in the range $\lambda \in [0,0.8785]$ is given by

$$\psi = -2 \ln \left[e^{-\psi_m/2}\cosh \left(\frac{\sqrt{\lambda}}{\sqrt 2}e^{-\psi_m/2}r\right)\right]$$

where $\psi_m=\psi(0)$ is related to $\lambda$ as

$$e^{\psi_m/2} = \cosh \left(\frac{\sqrt{\lambda}}{\sqrt 2}e^{-\psi_m/2}\right).$$

The solution for $n=2$ that is valid in the range $\lambda \in [0,2]$ is given by

$$\psi = \ln \left[\frac{64e^{\psi_m}}{(\lambda  e^{\psi_m}r^2+8)^2}\right]$$

where $\psi_m=\psi(0)$ is related to $\lambda$ as

$$(\lambda e^{\psi_m}+8)^2 - 64 e^{\psi_m} =0.$$
