= Euler's three-body problem =

Problem in physics and astronomy

In physics, Euler's three-body problem is to solve for the motion of a particle that is acted upon by a field from two other point masses that are fixed in space. It is a particular version of the three-body problem. This version of it is exactly solvable, and yields an approximate solution for particles moving in the gravitational fields of prolate and oblate spheroids. This problem is named after Leonhard Euler, who discussed it in memoirs published in 1760. Important extensions and analyses to the three body problem were contributed subsequently by Joseph-Louis Lagrange, Joseph Liouville, Pierre-Simon Laplace, Carl Gustav Jacob Jacobi, Urbain Le Verrier, William Rowan Hamilton, Henri Poincaré and George David Birkhoff, among others. The Euler three-body problem is known by a variety of names, such as the problem of two fixed centers and the Euler–Jacobi problem. This dynamical system differs from the circular restricted three-body problem as the former solves the problem in a general inertial frame whereas the latter solves the problem in a gravitational rotating frame. The exact solution, in the full three dimensional case, can be expressed in terms of Weierstrass's elliptic functions For convenience, the problem may also be solved by numerical methods, such as Runge–Kutta integration of the equations of motion. The total energy of the moving particle is conserved, but its linear and angular momentum are not, since the two fixed centers can apply a net force and torque. Nevertheless, the particle has a second conserved quantity that corresponds to the angular momentum or to the Laplace–Runge–Lenz vector as limiting cases.

Euler's problem also covers the case when the particle is acted upon by other inverse-square central forces, such as the electrostatic interaction described by Coulomb's law. The classical solutions of the Euler problem have been used to study chemical bonding, using a semiclassical approximation of the energy levels of a single electron moving in the field of two atomic nuclei, such as the diatomic ion HeH^{2+}. This was first done by Wolfgang Pauli in 1921 in his doctoral dissertation under Arnold Sommerfeld, a study of the first ion of molecular hydrogen, namely the hydrogen molecular ion H_{2}^{+}. These energy levels can be calculated with reasonable accuracy using the Einstein–Brillouin–Keller method, which is also the basis of the Bohr model of atomic hydrogen. More recently, as explained further in the quantum-mechanical version, analytical solutions to the eigenvalues (energies) have been obtained: these are a generalization of the Lambert W function.

Various generalizations of Euler's problem are known; these generalizations add linear and inverse cubic forces and up to five centers of force. Special cases of these generalized problems include Darboux's problem and Velde's problem.

== Overview and history ==
Euler's three-body problem is to describe the motion of a particle under the influence of two centers that attract the particle with central forces that decrease with distance as an inverse-square law, such as Newtonian gravity or Coulomb's law. Examples of Euler's problem include an electron moving in the electric field of two nuclei, such as the hydrogen molecule-ion H^{+}_{2}. The strength of the two inverse-square forces need not be equal; for illustration, the two nuclei may have different charges, as in the molecular ion HeH^{2+}.

In Euler's three-body problem we assume that the two centres of attraction are stationary. This is not strictly true in a case like H^{+}_{2}, but the protons experience much less acceleration than the electron. However, the Euler three-body problem does not apply to a planet moving in the gravitational field of two stars, because in that case at least one of the stars experiences acceleration similar to that experienced by the planet.

This problem was first considered by Leonhard Euler, who showed that it had an exact solution in 1760. Joseph Louis Lagrange solved a generalized problem in which the centers exert both linear and inverse-square forces. Carl Gustav Jacob Jacobi showed that the rotation of the particle about the axis of the two fixed centers could be separated out, reducing the general three-dimensional problem to the planar problem.

In 2008, Diarmuid Ó Mathúna published a book entitled "Integrable Systems in Celestial Mechanics". In this book, he gives closed form solutions for both the planar two fixed centers problem and the three dimensional problem.

== Constants of motion ==
The problem of two fixed centers conserves energy; in other words, the total energy $E$ is a constant of motion. The potential energy is given by

$$V(\mathbf{r}) = - \frac{\mu_1}{r_1} - \frac{\mu_2}{r_2}$$

where $\mathbf{r}$ represents the particle's position, and $r_1$ and $r_2$ are the distances between the particle and the centers of force; $\mu_1$ and $\mu_2$ are constants that measure the strength of the first and second forces, respectively. The total energy equals sum of this potential energy with the particle's kinetic energy

$$E = \frac{\mathbf{p}^2}{2 m} + V(\mathbf{r})$$

where $m$ and $\mathbf{p}$ are the particle's mass and linear momentum, respectively.

The particle's linear and angular momentum are not conserved in Euler's problem, since the two centers of force act like external forces upon the particle, which may yield a net force and torque on the particle. Nevertheless, Euler's problem has a second constant of motion

$$C = r_{1}^{2}\,r_{2}^{2}\,\frac{d\theta_{1}}{dt} \frac{d\theta_{2}}{dt} - 2\,a \left( \mu_{1} \cos \theta_{1} + \mu_{2} \cos \theta_{2} \right),$$

where $2\,a$ is the separation of the two centers of force, $\theta_1$ and $\theta_2$ are the angles of the lines connecting the particle to the centers of force, with respect to the line connecting the centers. This second constant of motion was identified by E. T. Whittaker in his work on analytical mechanics, and generalized to $n$ dimensions by Coulson and Joseph in 1967. In the Coulson–Joseph form, the constant of motion is written

$$B = \mathbf{L}^2 +  a^2 p_n^2 + 2\,a\,x_n \left(\frac{\mu_1 }{r_1} - \frac{\mu_2}{r_2} \right),$$

where $p_n$ denotes the momentum component along the $x_n$ axis on which the attracting centers are located. (Note: The latter expression differs from the constant C above by the additional term $2\,c^2 E$) This constant of motion corresponds to the total angular momentum squared $\mathbf{L}^2$ in the limit when the two centers of force converge to a single point ($a\rightarrow 0$), and proportional to the Laplace–Runge–Lenz vector $\mathbf{A}$ in the limit when one of the centers goes to infinity ($a\rightarrow\infty$ while $|x_n - a|$ remains finite).

== Quantum mechanical version ==
A special case of the quantum mechanical three-body problem is the hydrogen molecule ion, H^{+}_{2}. Two of the three bodies are nuclei and the third is a fast moving electron. The two nuclei are 1800 times heavier than the electron and thus modeled as fixed centers. It is well known that the Schrödinger wave equation is separable in prolate spheroidal coordinates and can be decoupled into two ordinary differential equations coupled by the energy eigenvalue and a separation constant. However, solutions required series expansions from basis sets. Nonetheless, through experimental mathematics, it was found that the energy eigenvalue was mathematically a generalization of the Lambert W function (see Lambert W function and references therein for more details). The hydrogen molecular ion in the case of clamped nuclei can be completely worked out within a Computer algebra system. The fact that its solution is an implicit function is revealing in itself. One of the successes of theoretical physics is not simply a matter that it is amenable to a mathematical treatment but that the algebraic equations involved can be symbolically manipulated until an analytical solution, preferably a closed form solution, is isolated. This type of solution for a special case of the three-body problem shows us the possibilities of what is possible as an analytical solution for the quantum three-body and many-body problem.

== Generalizations ==
An exhaustive analysis of the soluble generalizations of Euler's three-body problem was carried out by Adam Hiltebeitel in 1911. The simplest generalization of Euler's three-body problem is to add a third center of force midway between the original two centers, that exerts only a linear Hooke force. The next generalization is to augment the inverse-square force laws with a force that increases linearly with distance. The final set of generalizations is to add two fixed centers of force at positions that are imaginary numbers, with forces that are both linear and inverse-square laws, together with a force parallel to the axis of imaginary centers and varying as the inverse cube of the distance to that axis.

The solution to the original Euler problem is an approximate solution for the motion of a particle in the gravitational field of a prolate body, i.e., a sphere that has been elongated in one direction, such as a cigar shape. The corresponding approximate solution for a particle moving in the field of an oblate spheroid (a sphere squashed in one direction) is obtained by making the positions of the two centers of force into imaginary numbers. The oblate spheroid solution is astronomically more important, since most planets, stars and galaxies are approximately oblate spheroids; prolate spheroids are very rare.

The analogue of the oblate case in general relativity is a Kerr black hole. The geodesics around this object are known to be integrable, owing to the existence of a fourth constant of motion (in addition to energy, angular momentum, and the magnitude of four-momentum), known as the Carter constant. Euler's oblate three body problem and a Kerr black hole share the same mass moments, and this is most apparent if the metric for the latter is written in Kerr–Schild coordinates.

The analogue of the oblate case augmented with a linear Hooke term is a Kerr–de Sitter black hole. As in Hooke's law, the cosmological constant term depends linearly on distance from the origin, and the Kerr–de Sitter spacetime also admits a Carter-type constant quadratic in the momenta.

== Mathematical solutions ==
=== Original Euler problem ===
In the original Euler problem, the two centers of force acting on the particle are assumed to be fixed in space; let these centers be located along the x-axis at ±a. The particle is likewise assumed to be confined to a fixed plane containing the two centers of force. The potential energy of the particle in the field of these centers is given by

$$V(x, y) = \frac{-\mu_1}{\sqrt{\left( x - a \right)^2 + y^2}} - \frac{\mu_2}{\sqrt{\left( x + a \right)^2 + y^2}} .$$

where the proportionality constants μ_{1} and μ_{2} may be positive or negative. The two centers of attraction can be considered as the foci of a set of ellipses. If either center were absent, the particle would move on one of these ellipses, as a solution of the Kepler problem. Therefore, according to Bonnet's theorem, the same ellipses are the solutions for the Euler problem.

Introducing elliptic coordinates,

$$\,x = \,a \cosh \xi \cos \eta,$$

$$\,y = \,a \sinh \xi \sin \eta,$$

the potential energy can be written as

$$\begin{align}
V(\xi, \eta) & = \frac{-\mu_{1}}{a\left( \cosh \xi - \cos \eta \right)} - \frac{\mu_{2}}{a\left( \cosh \xi + \cos \eta \right)} \\[8pt]
& = \frac{-\mu_{1} \left( \cosh \xi + \cos \eta \right) - \mu_{2} \left( \cosh \xi - \cos \eta \right)}{a\left( \cosh^{2} \xi - \cos^{2} \eta \right)},
\end{align}$$

and the kinetic energy as

$$T = \frac{ma^{2}}{2} \left( \cosh^{2} \xi - \cos^{2} \eta \right) \left( \dot{\xi}^{2} + \dot{\eta}^{2} \right).$$

This is a Liouville dynamical system if ξ and η are taken as φ_{1} and φ_{2}, respectively; thus, the function Y equals

$$\,Y = \cosh^{2} \xi - \cos^{2} \eta$$

and the function W equals

$$W = -\mu_{1} \left( \cosh \xi + \cos \eta \right) - \mu_{2} \left( \cosh \xi - \cos \eta \right).$$

Using the general solution for a Liouville dynamical system, one obtains

$$\frac{ma^{2}}{2} \left( \cosh^{2} \xi - \cos^{2} \eta \right)^{2} \dot{\xi}^{2} = E \cosh^{2} \xi + \left( \frac{\mu_{1} + \mu_{2}}{a} \right) \cosh \xi - \gamma$$

$$\frac{ma^{2}}{2} \left( \cosh^{2} \xi - \cos^{2} \eta \right)^{2} \dot{\eta}^{2} = -E \cos^{2} \eta + \left( \frac{\mu_{1} - \mu_{2}}{a} \right) \cos \eta + \gamma$$

Introducing a parameter u by the formula

$$du = \frac{d\xi}{\sqrt{E \cosh^2 \xi + \left( \frac{\mu_1 + \mu_2}{a} \right) \cosh \xi - \gamma}} =
\frac{d\eta}{\sqrt{-E \cos^2 \eta + \left( \frac{\mu_1 - \mu_2}{a} \right) \cos \eta + \gamma}},$$

gives the parametric solution

$$u = \int \frac{d\xi}{\sqrt{E \cosh^{2} \xi + \left( \frac{\mu_{1} + \mu_{2}}{a} \right) \cosh \xi - \gamma}} =
\int \frac{d\eta}{\sqrt{-E \cos^{2} \eta + \left( \frac{\mu_{1} - \mu_{2}}{a} \right) \cos \eta + \gamma}}.$$

Since these are elliptic integrals, the coordinates ξ and η can be expressed as elliptic functions of u.

== See also ==
- Carter constant
- Hydrogen molecular ion
- Jacobi integral
- Lagrangian point
- Liouville dynamical system
- Three-body problem
