= Chandrasekhar limit =

Maximum mass of a stable white dwarf star

The Chandrasekhar limit (/ˌtʃəndrəˈʃeɪkər/) is the maximum mass of a stable white dwarf star. These stars resist gravitational collapse primarily through electron degeneracy pressure, compared to main sequence stars, which resist collapse through thermal pressure. The Chandrasekhar limit is the mass above which electron degeneracy pressure in the star's core is insufficient to balance the star's own gravitational self-attraction. The value of the Chandrasekhar limit depends upon the ratio of the number of electrons to nucleons (neutrons plus protons) in the star. For small stars this ratio is around 1/2 and the limit is about 1.44 M_{☉}. The limit was named after Subrahmanyan Chandrasekhar who won the 1983 Nobel prize together with William Alfred Fowler for work on stellar models.

== Physics ==
Radius–mass relations for a model white dwarf. Using the general pressure law for an ideal Fermi gas Non-relativistic ideal Fermi gas Ultrarelativistic limit

Normal stars fuse gravitationally compressed hydrogen into helium, generating vast amounts of heat. As the hydrogen is consumed, the stars' core compresses further allowing the helium and heavier nuclei to fuse ultimately resulting in stable iron nuclei, a process called stellar evolution. The next step depends upon the mass of the star. Stars below the Chandrasekhar limit become stable white dwarf stars, remaining that way throughout the rest of the history of the universe (assuming the absence of external forces). Stars above the limit can become neutron stars or black holes.

The Chandrasekhar limit is a consequence of competition between gravity and electron degeneracy pressure. Electron degeneracy pressure is a quantum-mechanical effect arising from the Pauli exclusion principle. Since electrons are fermions, no two electrons can be in the same state, so not all electrons can be in the minimum-energy level. Rather, electrons must occupy a band of energy levels. Compression of the electron gas increases the number of electrons in a given volume and raises the maximum energy level in the occupied band. Therefore, the energy of the electrons increases on compression, so pressure must be exerted on the electron gas to compress it, producing electron degeneracy pressure. With sufficient compression, electrons are forced into nuclei in the process of electron capture, relieving the pressure.

In the nonrelativistic case, electron degeneracy pressure gives rise to an equation of state of the form P = K_{1}ρ^{5/3}, where P is the pressure, ρ is the mass density, and K_{1} is a constant. Solving the hydrostatic equation leads to a model white dwarf that is a polytrope of index 3/2 – and therefore has radius inversely proportional to the cube root of its mass, and volume inversely proportional to its mass.

As the mass of a model white dwarf increases, the typical energies to which degeneracy pressure forces the electrons are no longer negligible relative to their rest masses. The speeds of the electrons approach the speed of light, and special relativity must be taken into account. In the strongly relativistic limit, the equation of state takes the form P = K_{2}ρ^{4/3}. This yields a polytrope of index 3, which has a total mass, M_{limit}, depending only on K_{2}.

For a fully relativistic treatment, the equation of state used interpolates between the equations P = K_{1}ρ^{5/3} for small ρ and P = K_{2}ρ^{4/3} for large ρ. When this is done, the model radius still decreases with mass, but becomes zero at M_{limit}. This is the Chandrasekhar limit. The curves of radius against mass for the non-relativistic and relativistic models are shown in the graph. They are colored blue and green, respectively. μ_{e} has been set equal to 2. Radius is measured in standard solar radii or kilometers, and mass in standard solar masses.

Calculated values for the limit vary depending on the nuclear composition of the mass. Chandrasekhar gives the following expression, based on the equation of state for an ideal Fermi gas:
$$M_\text{limit} = \frac{\omega_3^0 \sqrt{3\pi}}{2} \left ( \frac{\hbar c}{G}\right )^\frac{3}{2} \frac{1}{(\mu_\text{e} m_\text{H})^2}$$
where:

- ħ is the reduced Planck constant
- c is the speed of light
- G is the gravitational constant
- μ_{e} is the average molecular weight per electron, which depends upon the chemical composition of the star
- m_{H} is the mass of the hydrogen atom
- ω^{0}_{3} ≈ 2.018236 is a constant connected with the solution to the Lane–Emden equation

As $\sqrt{\hbar c/G}$ is the Planck mass, the limit is of the order of
$$\frac{M_\text{Pl}^3}{m_\text{H}^2}$$
The limiting mass can be obtained formally from the Chandrasekhar's white dwarf equation by taking the limit of large central density.

A more accurate value of the limit than that given by this simple model requires adjusting for various factors, including electrostatic interactions between the electrons and nuclei and effects caused by nonzero temperature. Lieb and Yau have given a rigorous derivation of the limit from a relativistic many-particle Schrödinger equation.

== History ==
In 1926, the British physicist Ralph H. Fowler observed that the relationship between the density, energy, and temperature of white dwarfs could be explained by viewing them as a gas of nonrelativistic, non-interacting electrons and nuclei that obey Fermi–Dirac statistics. This Fermi gas model was then used by the British physicist Edmund Clifton Stoner in 1929 to calculate the relationship among the mass, radius, and density of white dwarfs, assuming they were homogeneous spheres. Wilhelm Anderson applied a relativistic correction to this model, giving rise to a maximum possible mass of approximately 1.37×10^{30} kg. In 1930, Stoner derived the internal energy–density equation of state for a Fermi gas, and was then able to treat the mass–radius relationship in a fully relativistic manner, giving a limiting mass of approximately 2.19×10^{30} kg (for μ_{e} = 2.5). Stoner went on to derive the pressure–density equation of state, which he published in 1932. These equations of state were also previously published by the Soviet physicist Yakov Frenkel in 1928, together with some other remarks on the physics of degenerate matter. Frenkel's work, however, was ignored by the astronomical and astrophysical community.

A series of papers published between 1931 and 1935 had its beginning on a trip from India to England in 1930, where the Indian physicist Subrahmanyan Chandrasekhar worked on the calculation of the statistics of a degenerate Fermi gas. In these papers, Chandrasekhar solved the hydrostatic equation together with the nonrelativistic Fermi gas equation of state, and also treated the case of a relativistic Fermi gas, giving rise to the value of the limit shown above. Chandrasekhar reviews this work in his Nobel Prize lecture.

The existence of a related limit, based on the conceptual breakthrough of combining relativity with Fermi degeneracy, was first established in separate papers published by Wilhelm Anderson and E. C. Stoner for a uniform density star in 1929. Eric G. Blackman wrote that the roles of Stoner and Anderson in the discovery of mass limits were overlooked when Freeman Dyson wrote a biography of Chandrasekhar. Michael Nauenberg claims that Stoner established the mass limit first. The priority dispute has also been discussed at length by Virginia Trimble who writes that: "Chandrasekhar famously, perhaps even notoriously did his critical calculation on board ship in 1930, and ... was not aware of either Stoner's or Anderson's work at the time. His work was therefore independent, but, more to the point, he adopted Eddington's polytropes for his models which could, therefore, be in hydrostatic equilibrium, which constant density stars cannot, and real ones must be." This value was also computed in 1932 by the Soviet physicist Lev Landau, who, however, did not apply it to white dwarfs and concluded that quantum laws might be invalid for stars heavier than 1.5 solar mass.

=== Chandrasekhar–Eddington dispute ===
In 1935, Chandrasekhar presented his work on the limit at a scientific conference. It was immediately opposed by the established British astrophysicist Arthur Eddington. Eddington was aware that the existence of black holes was theoretically possible, and also realized that the existence of the limit made their formation possible. However, he was unwilling to accept that this could happen. After the talk by Chandrasekhar on the limit, Eddington remarked:

The star has to go on radiating and radiating and contracting and contracting until, I suppose, it gets down to a few km radius, when gravity becomes strong enough to hold in the radiation, and the star can at last find peace. ... I think there should be a law of Nature to prevent a star from behaving in this absurd way!

Eddington's proposed solution to the perceived problem was to modify relativistic mechanics so as to make the law P = K_{1}ρ^{5/3} universally applicable, even for large ρ. Although Niels Bohr, Fowler, Wolfgang Pauli, and other physicists agreed with Chandrasekhar's analysis, at the time, owing to Eddington's status, they were unwilling to publicly support Chandrasekhar. Through the rest of his life, Eddington held to his position in his writings, including his work on his fundamental theory. The drama associated with this disagreement is one of the main themes of Empire of the Stars, Arthur I. Miller's biography of Chandrasekhar. In Miller's view:

Chandra's discovery might well have transformed and accelerated developments in both physics and astrophysics in the 1930s. Instead, Eddington's heavy-handed intervention lent weighty support to the conservative community astrophysicists, who steadfastly refused even to consider the idea that stars might collapse to nothing. As a result, Chandra's work was almost forgotten.

However, Chandrasekhar chose to move on, leaving the study of stellar structure to focus on stellar dynamics. In 1983 in recognition for his work, Chandrasekhar shared a Nobel prize "for his theoretical studies of the physical processes of importance to the structure and evolution of the stars" with William Alfred Fowler.

== Applications ==
The core of a star is kept from collapsing by the heat generated by the fusion of nuclei of lighter elements into heavier ones. At various stages of stellar evolution, the nuclei required for this process are exhausted, and the core collapses, causing it to become denser and hotter. A critical situation arises when iron accumulates in the core, since iron nuclei are incapable of generating further energy through fusion. If the core becomes sufficiently dense, electron degeneracy pressure will play a significant part in stabilizing it against gravitational collapse.

If a main-sequence star is not too massive (less than approximately 8 solar masses), it eventually sheds enough mass to form a white dwarf having mass below the Chandrasekhar limit, which consists of the former core of the star. For more-massive stars, electron degeneracy pressure does not keep the iron core from collapsing to very great density, leading to formation of a neutron star, black hole, or, speculatively, a quark star. (For very massive, low-metallicity stars, it is also possible that instabilities destroy the star completely.) During the collapse, neutrons are formed by the capture of electrons by protons in the process of electron capture, leading to the emission of neutrinos. The decrease in gravitational potential energy of the collapsing core releases a large amount of energy on the order of 10^{46} J (100 foes). Most of this energy is carried away by the emitted neutrinos and the kinetic energy of the expanding shell of gas; only about 1% is emitted as optical light. This process is believed responsible for supernovae of types Ib, Ic, and II.

Type Ia supernovae derive their energy from runaway fusion of the nuclei in the interior of a white dwarf. This fate may befall carbon–oxygen white dwarfs that accrete matter from a companion giant star, leading to a steadily increasing mass. As the white dwarf's mass approaches the Chandrasekhar limit, its central density increases, and, as a result of compressional heating, its temperature also increases. This eventually ignites nuclear fusion reactions, leading to an immediate carbon detonation, which disrupts the star and causes the supernova.

A strong indication of the reliability of Chandrasekhar's formula is that the absolute magnitudes of supernovae of Type Ia are all approximately the same; at maximum luminosity, M_{V} is approximately −19.3, with a standard deviation of no more than 0.3. A 1-sigma interval therefore represents a factor of less than 2 in luminosity. This seems to indicate that all Type Ia supernovae convert approximately the same amount of mass to energy.

== Super-Chandrasekhar mass supernovae ==
In April 2003, the Supernova Legacy Survey observed a type Ia supernova, designated SNLS-03D3bb, in a galaxy approximately 4 billion light years away. According to astronomers at the University of Toronto and elsewhere, the observations of this supernova are best explained by assuming that it arose from a white dwarf that had grown to twice the mass of the Sun before exploding.

They believe that the star, dubbed the "Champagne Supernova" may have been spinning so fast that a centrifugal tendency allowed it to exceed the limit. Alternatively, the supernova may have resulted from the merger of two white dwarfs, so that the limit was only violated momentarily. Another way to potentially explain the problem of the Champagne Supernova was considering it the result of an aspherical explosion of a white dwarf. However, spectropolarimetric observations of SN 2009dc showed it had a polarization smaller than 0.3, making the large asphericity theory unlikely. Nevertheless, they point out that this observation poses a challenge to the use of type Ia supernovae as standard candles.

Since the observation of the Champagne Supernova in 2003, several more Type Ia supernovae have been observed that are very bright, and thought to have originated from white dwarfs whose masses exceeded the Chandrasekhar limit. These include SN 2006gz, SN 2007if, and SN 2009dc. These super-Chandrasekhar mass white dwarfs are believed to have had masses up to 2.4–2.8 solar masses.

Theoretical studies of white dwarf stars with very high magnetic fields predict Landau quantization of the electron gas and under these conditions the white dwarf can form from a mass exceeding the Chandrasekhar limit.

== Tolman–Oppenheimer–Volkoff limit ==
Stars sufficiently massive to pass the Chandrasekhar limit provided by electron degeneracy pressure do not become white dwarf stars. Instead they explode as supernovae. If the final mass is below the Tolman–Oppenheimer–Volkoff limit, then neutron degeneracy pressure contributes to the balance against gravity and the result will be a neutron star; but if the total mass is above the Tolman–Oppenheimer–Volkoff limit, the result will be a black hole.

== See also ==
- Bekenstein bound
- Chandrasekhar's white dwarf equation
- Schönberg–Chandrasekhar limit
- Tolman–Oppenheimer–Volkoff limit
