= Robert Emden =

Swiss Astrophysicist and Meteorologist (1862–1940)

- Born: Jacob Robert Emden; 4 March 1862; St. Gallen, Switzerland
- Died: 8 October 1940 (aged 78); Zurich, Switzerland
- Education: University of Strasbourg
- Known for: Lane–Emden equation
- Children: 5
- Scientific career
- Fields: Astrophysicist and Meteorologist
- Workplaces: Technical University of Munich; Bavarian Academy of Sciences and Humanities
- Thesis: On the Vapour Pressure of Salt Solutions (1887)

Jacob Robert Emden (4 March 1862 – 8 October 1940) was a Swiss astrophysicist and meteorologist. He is best known for his book, Gaskugeln: Anwendungen der mechanischen Wärmetheorie auf kosmologische und meteorologische probleme (Gas spheres: Applications of the mechanical heat theory to cosmological and meteorological problems), published in 1907. It presents a mathematical model of the behaviour of polytropic gaseous stellar objects under the influence of their own gravity, known as the Lane–Emden equation.

== Career ==
Emden was born in St. Gallen, Switzerland, the eldest of three children. He studied mathematics and physics in Heidelberg and Berlin and completed his BS physics in 1885, and his PhD in physics in 1887 at the University of Strasbourg, which at the time was in the German Empire. His thesis was on the vapour pressure of salt solutions. He was appointed professor of physics at the Technical University of Munich in 1889. He became associate professor of physics and meteorology at the Technical University of Munich (1907–1920) and in 1907 published the classical work Gaskugeln: Anwendungen der mechanischen Wärmetheorie auf kosmologische und meteorologische probleme.

Emden was a member of the Bayerische Akademie der Wissenschaften from 1920 to 1933. In 1924, he became honorary professor of astrophysics at the Ludwig-Maximilians-Universität München. In 1930, Emden assisted in the founding of Zeitschrift fur Astrophysik and served as the editor for six years. On 10 June 1932, he became an Associate of the Royal Astronomical Society. He retired in 1934.

== Influence in physics and meteorology ==
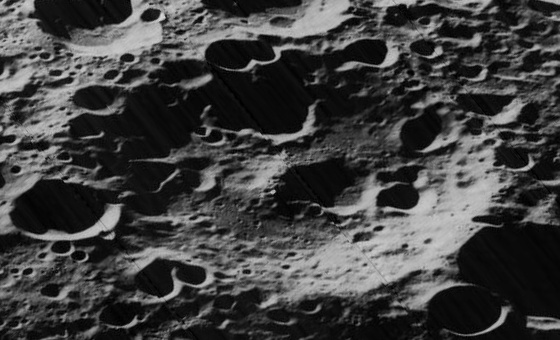
Emden Crater

Most of Emden's work related to thermodynamics applied to natural phenomena, while his published papers focused on geophysics and astrophysics. Emden's book Gaskugeln: Anwendungen der mechanischen Wärmetheorie auf kosmologische und meteorologische probleme presented a mathematical model to explain the expansion and compression of gas spheres. The book also includes a short section on Karl Schwarzschild's theory of convective equilibrium. Emden's work, in conjunction with Subrahmanyan Chandrasekhar, was named the Emden–Chandrasekhar equation. In a major advance over previous work, by introducing polytropic solutions, modelling of a much broader range of stellar objects was possible.

His theories also suggested that stars have a boundary at a finite radius. This work, in conjunction with Jonathan Homer Lane, became known as the Lane-Emden equation. The Lane-Emden equation can be described as "a second-order ordinary differential equation that applies to polytropic profiles in density". The Lane-Emden equations were later studied by Ralph H. Fowler who developed a new set of solutions for different values of n and for all types of boundary conditions. These became known as Emden-Fowler-type differential equations. Emden's convective stellar models have been supplanted by radiative theory.

Robert Emden also offered a hypothesis, which has since been discredited, to explain sunspots.

The crater Emden on the Moon is named after him.

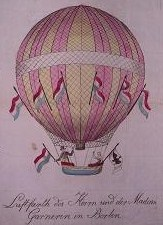
Historic Hot Air Balloon

== Personal life ==
Robert Emden married Klara Schwarzschild, the sister of German physicist and astronomer Karl Schwarzschild and the aunt of the German-American astrophysicist Martin Schwarzschild. They had six children of whom the names of five are known: Charlotte Schein; Emma Müller; Antonia Flach; Karl Emden, and Johanna Luise Berchtold-Emden. Although he married into a strongly scientific family, Robert Emden's children are not noted for any contributions to science.

Emden was an avid balloonist and wrote a book on the principles of balloon navigation in 1910. He always had a practical attitude towards physics, as shown by his 1938 letter to Nature entitled "Why do we have winter heating?" Although he had retired in 1934, Jacob Robert Emden continued his scientific activities until he died in Zurich on 8 October 1940. His final paper on the temperature problems of lakes was in the press at the time of his death.
