= Liouville's equation =

Equation in differential geometry

For Liouville's equation in dynamical systems, see Liouville's theorem (Hamiltonian).
For Liouville's equation in quantum mechanics, see Von Neumann equation.
For Liouville's equation in Euclidean space, see Liouville–Bratu–Gelfand equation.

Liouville's equation, named after Joseph Liouville, is a nonlinear partial differential equation that arises in differential geometry when studying surfaces of constant curvature. It plays a central role in the theory of conformal geometry, where one seeks to understand how a curved surface can be represented in flat (Euclidean) coordinates while preserving angles. Liouville's equation appear in many areas of physics, including Emden–Chandrasekhar equation for isothermal stars, Frank-Kamenetskii problem of thermal explosions, Stuart vortex in hydrodynamics, space charge of electricity around a glowing wire and describes planetary nebula.

Suppose a surface is described in local coordinates $(x, y)$, and we wish to assign it a Riemannian metric that has constant Gaussian curvature $K$. A particularly useful form of such a metric is $f(x,y)^2(dx^2+dy^2)$, where the function $f(x, y)$ determines the local scaling of lengths. The equation satisfied by this conformal factor $f$ is called Liouville's equation:

$\Delta_0 \log f = -K f^2,$

where $\Delta_0 = \frac{\partial^2}{\partial x^2} + \frac{\partial^2}{\partial y^2}$ is the flat Laplace operator in two dimensions.

This equation governs how to deform flat space to give it constant curvature. For example, when $K > 0$, it describes spherical geometry; when $K < 0$, hyperbolic geometry. The function $f(x, y)$ tells how much the flat metric must be stretched or shrunk at each point to reflect this curvature.

Liouville's equation is closely tied to the use of isothermal coordinates, in which the metric takes a conformally flat form. It also appears in complex analysis, as the conformal factor can be expressed using Wirtinger derivatives:

$\Delta_0 = 4 \frac{\partial}{\partial z} \frac{\partial}{\partial \bar z}.$

A logarithmic change of variable, $u = \log f$, gives a more commonly used form of the equation:

$\Delta_0 u = -K e^{2u}.$

Liouville's equation also features in mathematical physics (e.g., in models of 2D gravity) and was cited by David Hilbert in his formulation of the nineteenth problem, concerning the smoothness of solutions to certain elliptic PDEs.

== Other common forms of Liouville's equation ==
By using the change of variables log f ↦ u, another commonly found form of Liouville's equation is obtained:

$$\Delta_0 u = - K e^{2u}.$$

Other two forms of the equation, commonly found in the literature, are obtained by using the slight variant 2 log f ↦ u of the previous change of variables and Wirtinger calculus: $\Delta_0 u = - 2K e^{u}\quad\Longleftrightarrow\quad \frac{\partial^2 u}{{\partial z}{\partial \bar z}} = - \frac{K}{2} e^{u}.$

Note that it is exactly in the first one of the preceding two forms that Liouville's equation was cited by David Hilbert in the formulation of his nineteenth problem. (Note: Hilbert assumes K = -1/2, therefore the equation appears as the following semilinear elliptic equation $$\frac{\partial^2 f}{\partial x^2} + \frac{\partial^2 f}{\partial y^2} = e^f$$)

=== A formulation using the Laplace–Beltrami operator ===
In a more invariant fashion, the equation can be written in terms of the intrinsic Laplace–Beltrami operator

$$\Delta_{\mathrm{LB}} = \frac{1}{f^2} \Delta_0$$

as follows:

$$\Delta_{\mathrm{LB}}\log\; f = -K.$$

== Properties ==
=== Relation to Gauss–Codazzi equations ===
Liouville's equation is equivalent to the Gauss–Codazzi equations for minimal immersions into the 3-space, when the metric is written in isothermal coordinates $z$ such that the Hopf differential is $\mathrm{d}z^2$.

=== General solution of the equation ===
In a simply connected domain Ω, the general solution of Liouville's equation can be found by using Wirtinger calculus. Its form is given by

$$u(z,\bar z) = \ln \left(
4 \frac{ \left|{\mathrm{d} f(z)}/{\mathrm{d} z}\right|^2  }{ ( 1+K \left|f(z)\right|^2)^2 }
\right)$$

where f (z) is any meromorphic function such that

- df/dz(z) ≠ 0 for every z ∈ Ω.
- f (z) has at most simple poles in Ω.

== Radially symmetric forms ==
If the system to be studied is radially symmetric, then the equation in $n$ dimension becomes

$$\psi'' + \frac{n-1}{r}\psi' + \lambda e^\psi=0$$

where $r$ is the distance from the origin. With the boundary conditions

$$\psi'(0)=0, \quad \psi(1) = 0$$

and for $\lambda\geq 0$, a real solution exists only for $\lambda \in [0,\lambda_c]$, where $\lambda_c$ is the critical parameter called as Frank-Kamenetskii parameter. The critical parameter is $\lambda_c=0.8785$ for $n=1$, $\lambda_c=2$ for $n=2$ and $\lambda_c=3.32$ for $n=3$. For $n=1, \ 2$, two solution exists and for $3\leq n\leq 9$ infinitely many solution exists with solutions oscillating about the point $\lambda=2(n-2)$. For $n\geq 10$, the solution is unique and in these cases the critical parameter is given by $\lambda_c=2(n-2)$. Multiplicity of solution for $n=3$ was discovered by Israel Gelfand in 1963 and in later 1973 generalized for all $n$ by Daniel D. Joseph and Thomas S. Lundgren.

The solution for $n=1$ that is valid in the range $\lambda \in [0,0.8785]$ is given by

$$\psi = -2 \ln \left[e^{-\psi_m/2}\cosh \left(\frac{\sqrt{\lambda}}{\sqrt 2}e^{-\psi_m/2}r\right)\right]$$

where $\psi_m=\psi(0)$ is related to $\lambda$ as

$$e^{\psi_m/2} = \cosh \left(\frac{\sqrt{\lambda}}{\sqrt 2}e^{-\psi_m/2}\right).$$

The solution for $n=2$ that is valid in the range $\lambda \in [0,2]$ is given by

$$\psi = \ln \left[\frac{64e^{\psi_m}}{(\lambda  e^{\psi_m}r^2+8)^2}\right]$$

where $\psi_m=\psi(0)$ is related to $\lambda$ as

$$(\lambda e^{\psi_m}+8)^2 - 64 e^{\psi_m} =0.$$

== Application ==
Liouville's equation can be used to prove the following classification results for surfaces:

Theorem. A surface in the Euclidean 3-space with metric dl^{2} = g(z,)dzd, and with constant scalar curvature K is locally isometric to:

1. the sphere if K > 0;
2. the Euclidean plane if K = 0;
3. the Lobachevskian plane if K < 0.

== See also ==
- Liouville field theory, a two-dimensional conformal field theory whose classical equation of motion is a generalization of Liouville's equation
- Yamabe equation, the higher dimensional analog of Liouville's equation.

== Works cited ==
- Dubrovin, B. A.; Novikov, S. P.; Fomenko, A. T. (1992) [First published 1984], Modern Geometry–Methods and Applications. Part I. The Geometry of Surfaces, Transformation Groups, and Fields, Graduate Studies in Mathematics, vol. 93 (2nd ed.), Berlin–Heidelberg–New York: Springer Verlag, pp. xv+468, ISBN 3-540-97663-9, MR 0736837, Zbl 0751.53001.
- Henrici, Peter (1993) [First published 1986], Applied and Computational Complex Analysis, Wiley Classics Library, vol. 3 (Reprint ed.), New York - Chichester - Brisbane - Toronto - Singapore: John Wiley & Sons, pp. X+637, ISBN 0-471-58986-1, MR 0822470, Zbl 1107.30300.
- Hilbert, David (1900), "Mathematische Probleme", Nachrichten von der Königlichen Gesellschaft der Wissenschaften zu Göttingen, Mathematisch-Physikalische Klasse (in German) (3): 253–297, JFM 31.0068.03, translated into English by Mary Frances Winston Newson as Hilbert, David (1902), "Mathematical Problems", Bulletin of the American Mathematical Society, 8 (10): 437–479, doi:10.1090/S0002-9904-1902-00923-3, JFM 33.0976.07, MR 1557926.
