= Liouville dynamical system =

In classical mechanics, a Liouville dynamical system (named after Joseph Liouville) is an exactly solvable dynamical system in which the kinetic energy T and potential energy V can be expressed in terms of the s generalized coordinates q as follows:

$$T = \frac{1}{2} \left\{ u_{1}(q_{1}) + u_{2}(q_{2}) + \cdots + u_{s}(q_{s}) \right\}
\left\{ v_{1}(q_{1}) \dot{q}_{1}^{2} + v_{2}(q_{2}) \dot{q}_{2}^{2} + \cdots + v_{s}(q_{s}) \dot{q}_{s}^{2} \right\}$$

$$V = \frac{w_{1}(q_{1}) + w_{2}(q_{2}) + \cdots + w_{s}(q_{s}) }{u_{1}(q_{1}) + u_{2}(q_{2}) + \cdots + u_{s}(q_{s}) }$$

The solution of this system consists of a set of separably integrable equations

$$\frac{\sqrt{2}}{Y}\, dt = \frac{d\varphi_{1}}{\sqrt{E \chi_{1} - \omega_{1} + \gamma_{1}}} =
\frac{d\varphi_{2}}{\sqrt{E \chi_{2} - \omega_{2} + \gamma_{2}}} = \cdots =
\frac{d\varphi_{s}}{\sqrt{E \chi_{s} - \omega_{s} + \gamma_{s}}}$$

where E = T + V is the conserved energy and the $\gamma_{s}$ are constants. As described below, the variables have been changed from q_{s} to φ_{s}, and the functions u_{s} and w_{s} substituted by their counterparts χ_{s} and ω_{s}. This solution has numerous applications, such as the orbit of a small planet about two fixed stars under the influence of Newtonian gravity. The Liouville dynamical system is one of several things named after Joseph Liouville, an eminent French mathematician.

== Example of bicentric orbits ==
In classical mechanics, Euler's three-body problem describes the motion of a particle in a plane under the influence of two fixed centers, each of which attract the particle with an inverse-square force such as Newtonian gravity or Coulomb's law. Examples of the bicenter problem include a planet moving around two slowly moving stars, or an electron moving in the electric field of two positively charged nuclei, such as the first ion of the hydrogen molecule H_{2}, namely the hydrogen molecular ion or H_{2}^{+}. The strength of the two attractions need not be equal; thus, the two stars may have different masses or the nuclei two different charges.

=== Solution ===
Let the fixed centers of attraction be located along the x-axis at ±a. The potential energy of the moving particle is given by

$$V(x, y) = \frac{-\mu_{1}}{\sqrt{\left( x - a \right)^{2} + y^{2}}} - \frac{\mu_{2}}{\sqrt{\left( x + a \right)^{2} + y^{2}}} .$$

The two centers of attraction can be considered as the foci of a set of ellipses. If either center were absent, the particle would move on one of these ellipses, as a solution of the Kepler problem. Therefore, according to Bonnet's theorem, the same ellipses are the solutions for the bicenter problem.

Introducing elliptic coordinates,

$$x = a \cosh \xi \cos \eta,$$

$$y = a \sinh \xi \sin \eta,$$

the potential energy can be written as

$$V(\xi, \eta) = \frac{-\mu_{1}}{a\left( \cosh \xi - \cos \eta \right)} - \frac{\mu_{2}}{a\left( \cosh \xi + \cos \eta \right)}
= \frac{-\mu_{1} \left( \cosh \xi + \cos \eta \right) - \mu_{2} \left( \cosh \xi - \cos \eta \right)}{a\left( \cosh^{2} \xi - \cos^{2} \eta \right)},$$

and the kinetic energy as

$$T = \frac{ma^{2}}{2} \left( \cosh^{2} \xi - \cos^{2} \eta \right) \left( \dot{\xi}^{2} + \dot{\eta}^{2} \right).$$

This is a Liouville dynamical system if ξ and η are taken as φ_{1} and φ_{2}, respectively; thus, the function Y equals

$$Y = \cosh^{2} \xi - \cos^{2} \eta$$

and the function W equals

$$W = -\mu_{1} \left( \cosh \xi + \cos \eta \right) - \mu_{2} \left( \cosh \xi - \cos \eta \right)$$

Using the general solution for a Liouville dynamical system below, one obtains

$$\frac{ma^{2}}{2} \left( \cosh^{2} \xi - \cos^{2} \eta \right)^{2} \dot{\xi}^{2} = E \cosh^{2} \xi + \left( \frac{\mu_{1} + \mu_{2}}{a} \right) \cosh \xi - \gamma$$

$$\frac{ma^{2}}{2} \left( \cosh^{2} \xi - \cos^{2} \eta \right)^{2} \dot{\eta}^{2} = -E \cos^{2} \eta + \left( \frac{\mu_{1} - \mu_{2}}{a} \right) \cos \eta + \gamma$$

Introducing a parameter u by the formula

$$du = \frac{d\xi}{\sqrt{E \cosh^{2} \xi + \left( \frac{\mu_{1} + \mu_{2}}{a} \right) \cosh \xi - \gamma}} =
\frac{d\eta}{\sqrt{-E \cos^{2} \eta + \left( \frac{\mu_{1} - \mu_{2}}{a} \right) \cos \eta + \gamma}},$$

gives the parametric solution

$$u = \int \frac{d\xi}{\sqrt{E \cosh^{2} \xi + \left( \frac{\mu_{1} + \mu_{2}}{a} \right) \cosh \xi - \gamma}} =
\int \frac{d\eta}{\sqrt{-E \cos^{2} \eta + \left( \frac{\mu_{1} - \mu_{2}}{a} \right) \cos \eta + \gamma}}.$$

Since these are elliptic integrals, the coordinates ξ and η can be expressed as elliptic functions of u.

=== Constant of motion ===
The bicentric problem has a constant of motion, namely,

$$r_{1}^{2}\,r_{2}^{2} \frac{d\theta_{1}}{dt} \frac{d\theta_{2}}{dt} +
2\,c \left( \mu_{1} \cos \theta_{1} - \mu_{2} \cos \theta_{2} \right),$$

from which the problem can be solved using the method of the last multiplier.

== Derivation ==
=== New variables ===
To eliminate the v functions, the variables are changed to an equivalent set

$$\varphi_{r} = \int dq_{r} \sqrt{v_{r}(q_{r})},$$

giving the relation

$$v_{1}(q_{1}) \dot{q}_{1}^{2} + v_{2}(q_{2}) \dot{q}_{2}^{2} + \cdots + v_{s}(q_{s}) \dot{q}_{s}^{2} =
\dot{\varphi}_{1}^{2} + \dot{\varphi}_{2}^{2} + \cdots + \dot{\varphi}_{s}^{2} = F,$$

which defines a new variable F. Using the new variables, the u and w functions can be expressed by equivalent functions χ and ω. Denoting the sum of the χ functions by Y,

$$Y = \chi_{1}(\varphi_{1}) + \chi_{2}(\varphi_{2}) + \cdots + \chi_{s}(\varphi_{s}),$$

the kinetic energy can be written as

$$T = \frac{1}{2} Y F.$$

Similarly, denoting the sum of the ω functions by W

$$W = \omega_{1}(\varphi_{1}) + \omega_{2}(\varphi_{2}) + \cdots + \omega_{s}(\varphi_{s}),$$

the potential energy V can be written as

$$V = \frac{W}{Y}.$$

=== Lagrange equation ===
The Lagrange equation for the r^{th} variable $\varphi_{r}$ is

$$\frac{d}{dt} \left( \frac{\partial T}{\partial \dot{\varphi}_{r}} \right) =
\frac{d}{dt} \left( Y \dot{\varphi}_{r} \right) = \frac{1}{2} F \frac{\partial Y}{\partial \varphi_{r}}
-\frac{\partial V}{\partial \varphi_{r}}.$$

Multiplying both sides by $2 Y \dot{\varphi}_{r}$, re-arranging, and exploiting the relation 2T = YF yields the equation

$$2 Y \dot{\varphi}_{r} \frac{d}{dt} \left(Y \dot{\varphi}_{r}\right) =
2T\dot{\varphi}_{r} \frac{\partial Y}{\partial \varphi_{r}} - 2 Y \dot{\varphi}_{r} \frac{\partial V}{\partial \varphi_{r}} =
2 \dot{\varphi}_{r} \frac{\partial}{\partial \varphi_{r}} \left[ (E-V) Y \right],$$

which may be written as

$$\frac{d}{dt} \left(Y^{2} \dot{\varphi}_{r}^{2} \right) =
2 E \dot{\varphi}_{r} \frac{\partial Y}{\partial \varphi_{r}} - 2 \dot{\varphi}_{r} \frac{\partial W}{\partial \varphi_{r}} =
2E \dot{\varphi}_{r} \frac{d\chi_{r} }{d\varphi_{r}} - 2 \dot{\varphi}_{r} \frac{d\omega_{r}}{d\varphi_{r}},$$

where E = T + V is the (conserved) total energy. It follows that

$$\frac{d}{dt} \left(Y^{2} \dot{\varphi}_{r}^{2} \right) =
2\frac{d}{dt} \left( E \chi_{r} - \omega_{r} \right),$$

which may be integrated once to yield

$$\frac{1}{2} Y^{2} \dot{\varphi}_{r}^{2} = E \chi_{r} - \omega_{r}  + \gamma_{r},$$

where the $\gamma_{r}$ are constants of integration subject to the energy conservation

$$\sum_{r=1}^{s} \gamma_{r} = 0.$$

Inverting, taking the square root and separating the variables yields a set of separably integrable equations:

$$\frac{\sqrt{2}}{Y} dt = \frac{d\varphi_{1}}{\sqrt{E \chi_{1} - \omega_{1} + \gamma_{1}}} =
\frac{d\varphi_{2}}{\sqrt{E \chi_{2} - \omega_{2} + \gamma_{2}}} = \cdots =
\frac{d\varphi_{s}}{\sqrt{E \chi_{s} - \omega_{s} + \gamma_{s}}}.$$
