= Chandrasekhar's white dwarf equation =

Relation between density and radius for a white dwarf

In astrophysics, Chandrasekhar's white dwarf equation is an initial value ordinary differential equation introduced by the Indian American astrophysicist Subrahmanyan Chandrasekhar, in his study of the gravitational potential of completely degenerate white dwarf stars. The equation reads as
$$\frac 1 {\eta^2} \frac d {d\eta}\left(\eta^2 \frac{d\varphi}{d\eta}\right) + (\varphi^2 - C)^{3/2} = 0$$
with initial conditions
$$\varphi(0)=1, \quad \varphi'(0)=0$$
where $\varphi$ measures the density of white dwarf, $\eta$ is the non-dimensional radial distance from the center and $C$ is a constant which is related to the density of the white dwarf at the center. The boundary $\eta=\eta_\infty$ of the equation is defined by the condition
$$\varphi(\eta_\infty) = \sqrt{C}.$$
such that the range of $\varphi$ becomes $\sqrt{C}\leq\varphi\leq 1$. This condition is equivalent to saying that the density vanishes at $\eta=\eta_\infty$.

== Derivation ==
From the quantum statistics of a completely degenerate electron gas (all the lowest quantum states are occupied), the pressure and the density of a white dwarf are calculated in terms of the maximum electron momentum $p_0$standardized as $x = p_0 / mc$, with pressure $P = A f(x)$ and density $\rho = B x^3$, where
$$\begin{align}
& A = \frac{\pi m_\text{e}^4 c^5}{3h^3} = 6.02\times 10^{21} \text{ Pa}, \\
& B = \frac{8\pi}{3}m_p\mu_\text{e}\left(\frac{m_\text{e} c}{h}\right)^3 = 9.82\times 10^8 \mu_\text{e} \text{ kg/m}^3, \\
& f(x) = x(2x^2-3)(x^2+1)^{1/2} + 3 \sinh^{-1} x,
\end{align}$$

$\mu_\text{e}$ is the mean molecular weight of the gas, and $h$ is the Planck constant.

When this is substituted into the hydrostatic equilibrium equation
$$\frac 1 {r^2} \frac{d}{dr}\left(\frac{r^2}{\rho}\frac{dP}{dr}\right)=-4\pi G \rho$$
where $G$ is the gravitational constant and $r$ is the radial distance, we get
$$\frac{1}{r^2} \frac{d}{dr}\left(r^2\frac{d\sqrt{x^2+1}}{dr}\right)=-\frac{\pi G B^2}{2A}x^3$$
and letting $y^2 = x^2 + 1$, we have
$$\frac{1}{r^2} \frac{d}{dr}\left(r^2\frac{dy}{dr}\right)=-\frac{\pi G B^2}{2A}(y^2-1)^{3/2}$$

If we denote the density at the origin as $\rho_\text{o} = B x_\text{o}^3 = B (y_\text{o}^2-1)^{3/2}$, then a non-dimensional scale
$$r = \left(\frac{2A}{\pi G B^2}\right)^{1/2} \frac{\eta}{y_\text{o}}, \quad y = y_\text{o} \varphi$$
gives
$$\frac{1}{\eta^2} \frac{d}{d\eta}\left(\eta^2 \frac{d\varphi}{d\eta}\right) + (\varphi^2 - C)^{3/2} = 0$$
where $C=1/y_\text{o}^2$. In other words, once the above equation is solved the density is given by
$$\rho = B y_\text{o}^3 \left(\varphi^2 - \frac 1 {y_\text{o}^2}\right)^{3/2}.$$

The mass interior to a specified point can then be calculated
$$M(\eta) = -\frac{4\pi}{B^2}\left(\frac{2A}{\pi G}\right)^{3/2}\eta^2\frac{d\varphi}{d\eta}.$$

The radius–mass relation of the white dwarf is usually plotted in the plane $\eta_\infty$–$M(\eta_\infty)$.

== Solution near the origin ==
In the neighborhood of the origin, $\eta\ll 1$, Chandrasekhar provided an asymptotic expansion as
$$\begin{align}
\varphi = {} & 1 - \frac{q^3} 6 \eta^2 + \frac{q^4}{40} \eta^4 - \frac{q^5(5q^2+14)}{7!} \eta^6 \\[6pt]
& {} + \frac{q^6(339q^2 + 280)}{3\times 9!}\eta^8 - \frac{q^7(1425q^4 + 11346q^2 + 4256)}{5\times 11!}\eta^{10} + \cdots
\end{align}$$
where $q^2 = C-1$. He also provided numerical solutions for the range $C = 0.01 - 0.8$.

== Equation for small central densities ==
When the central density $\rho_\text{o} = B x_\text{o}^3 = B (y_\text{o}^2-1)^{3/2}$ is small, the equation can be reduced to a Lane–Emden equation by introducing
$$\xi = \sqrt{2}\eta, \qquad \theta = \varphi^2-C= \varphi^2-1+x_\text{o}^2 + O(x_\text{o}^4)$$
to obtain at leading order, the following equation
$$\frac{1}{\xi^2}\frac{d}{d\xi}\left(\xi^2\frac{d\theta}{d\xi}\right) = - \theta^{3/2}$$
subjected to the conditions $\theta(0)=x_\text{o}^2$ and $\theta'(0)=0$. Note that although the equation reduces to the Lane–Emden equation with polytropic index $3/2$, the initial condition is not that of the Lane–Emden equation.

== Limiting mass for large central densities ==
When the central density becomes large, i.e., $y_\text{o}\rightarrow \infty$ or equivalently $C\rightarrow 0$, the governing equation reduces to
$$\frac{1}{\eta^2}\frac{d}{d\eta}\left(\eta^2\frac{d\varphi}{d\eta}\right) = - \varphi^{3}$$
subjected to the conditions $\varphi(0)=1$ and $\varphi'(0)=0$. This is exactly the Lane–Emden equation with polytropic index $3$. Note that in this limit of large densities, the radius
$$r = \left(\frac{2A}{\pi G B^2}\right)^{1/2} \frac{\eta}{y_\text{o}}$$
tends to zero. The mass of the white dwarf however tends to a finite limit
$$M\rightarrow - \frac{4\pi}{B^2}\left(\frac{2A}{\pi G}\right)^{3/2}\left(\eta^2 \frac{d\varphi}{d\eta}\right)_{\eta=\eta_\infty}=5.75 \mu_\text{e}^{-2}M_\odot.$$

The Chandrasekhar limit follows from this limit.

== See also ==
- Emden–Chandrasekhar equation
- Tolman–Oppenheimer–Volkoff equation
