= Tikhov (disambiguation) =

Tikhov may refer to:

- Gavriil Adrianovich Tikhov (1875–1960), Belarusian astronomer, and several objects names for him:
  - 2251 Tikhov, a main-belt asteroid
  - Tikhov (lunar crater)
  - Tikhov (Martian crater)
