= Emden (crater) =

Crater on the Moon

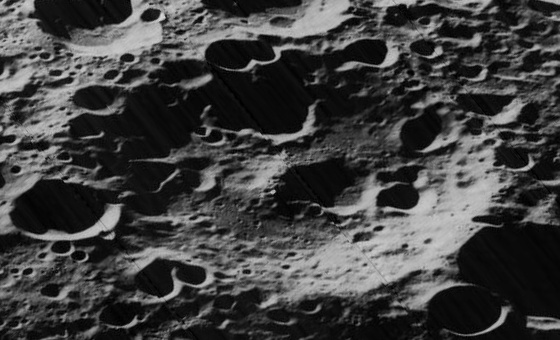
- Oblique Lunar Orbiter 5 image, facing west
- Coordinates: 63.3°N 177.3°W
- Diameter: 114.64 km (71.23 mi)
- Depth: Unknown
- Colongitude: 178° at sunrise
- Formation: Pre-Nectarian
- Eponym: J. Robert Emden

Emden is a lunar impact crater that is located in the northern hemisphere on the far side of the Moon. The crater lies to the northwest of the larger crater Rowland, and to the east-northeast of Tikhov.

This crater is dated to the Pre-Nectarian period of the lunar geologic timescale. It has been heavily damaged by subsequent impacts, leaving the rim worn and irregular and the interior partly covered by craters. The western half of the rim in particular is heavily damaged, with almost the entire edge and inner wall covered by overlapping craters. The most prominent of these is a crater along the southern wall. There is a merged crater pair on the western part of the interior floor and a joined crater pair on the northeast floor. The most intact area of floor is in the southeast, although even here the surface is pitted by multiple tiny craterlets.

This formation is named after Swiss astrophysicist and meteorologist Jacob Robert Emden (1862–1940). Its designation was formally adopted by the International Astronomical Union in 1970.

== Satellite craters ==
By convention these features are identified on lunar maps by placing the letter on the side of the crater midpoint that is closest to Emden.

Emden	Latitude	Longitude	Diameter
D	64.4° N	171.1° W	47 km
F	63.5° N	171.1° W	20 km
M	61.3° N	177.0° W	25 km
U	64.7° N	177.9° E	38 km
V	65.8° N	177.5° E	35 km
W	66.4° N	178.3° E	25 km
