= SN 2003fg =

Unusual Type Ia supernova in the constellation Böotes

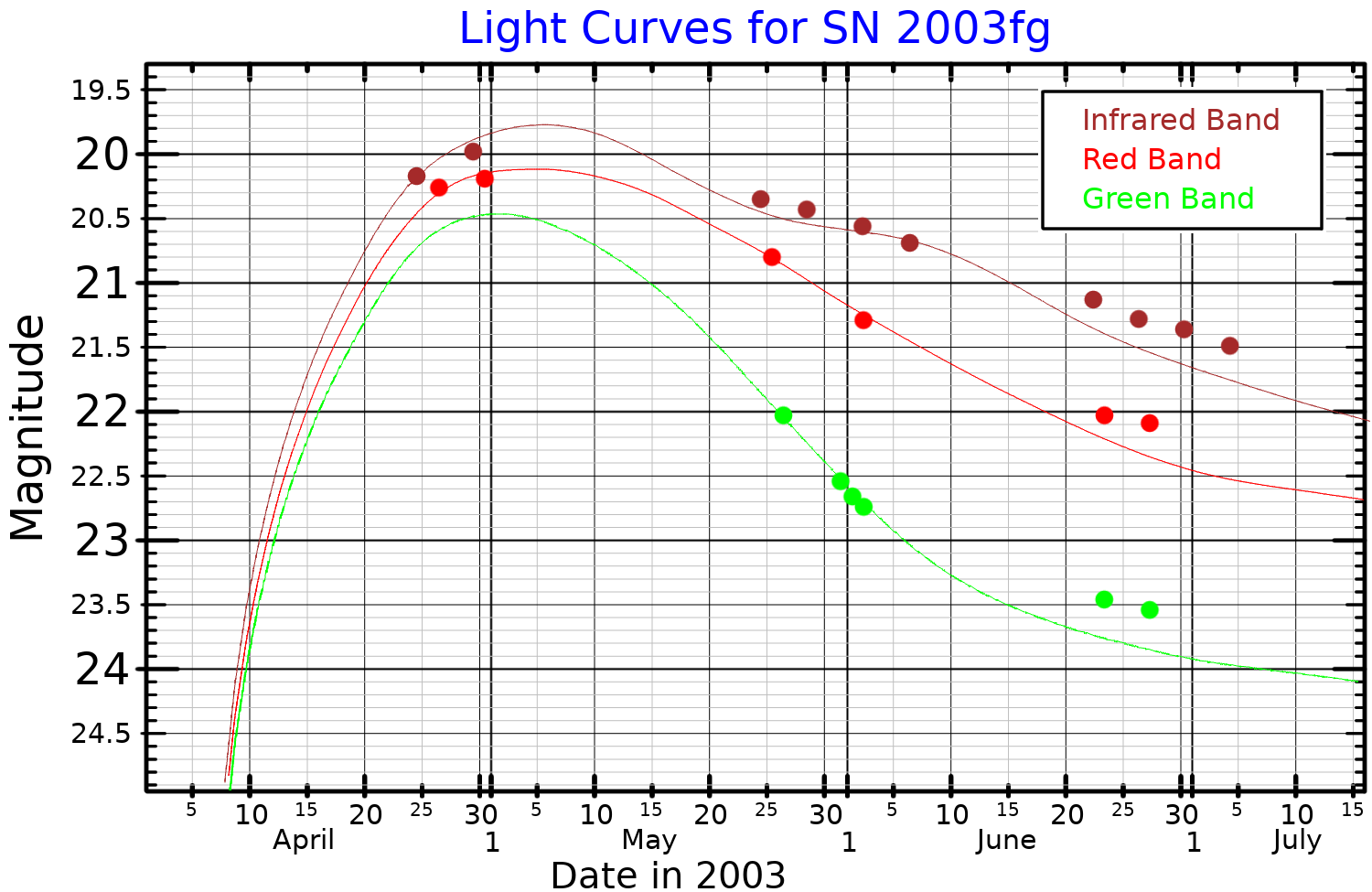
- Infrared, red and green light curves for SN 2003fg. Dots show the measurements, and the curves are model fits. Adapted from Howell et al. (2006)
- Event type: Supernova
- Aberrant Ia
- Date: 24 April 2003
- Constellation: Boötes
- Right ascension: 14^{h} 16^{m} 18.780^{s}
- Declination: +52° 14′ 55.39″
- Epoch: J2000.0
- Galactic coordinates: 096.3812 +60.2821
- Distance: 3,524.7 ± 246.8 Mly (1,080.68 ± 75.67 Mpc)
- Redshift: 0.244 ±0.0003
- Host: GSS 192_4835
- Notable features: Super Chandrasekhar
- Peak apparent magnitude: 20
- Other designations: SN 2003fg, SNLS 03D3bb

SN 2003fg, nicknamed the Champagne Supernova, was an unusual Type Ia supernova. It was discovered on 24 April 2003 with the Canada-France-Hawaii Telescope and the Keck Telescope, both on Mauna Kea in Hawaii, and announced by researchers at the University of Toronto. The supernova occurred in a galaxy some 3.5 billion light-years from Earth. David Branch gave its nickname because it is a reference to Oasis’ 1996 song, "Champagne Supernova".

It was unusual because of the mass of its progenitor. According to the current understanding, white dwarf stars explode as Type Ia supernovae when their mass approaches 1.4 solar masses, termed the Chandrasekhar limit. The mass added to the star is believed to be donated by a companion star, either from the companion's stellar wind or the overflow of its Roche lobe as it evolves.

However, the progenitor of SN 2003fg reached two solar masses before exploding. The primary mechanism invoked to explain how a white dwarf can exceed the Chandrasekhar mass is unusually rapid rotation; the added support effectively increases the critical mass. An alternative explanation is that the explosion resulted from the merger of two white dwarfs. The evidence indicating a higher than normal mass comes from the light curve and spectra of the supernova—while it was particularly overluminous, the kinetic energies measured from the spectra appeared smaller than usual. One proposed explanation is that more of the total kinetic energy budget was expended climbing out of the deeper than usual potential well.

This is important because the brightness of Type Ia supernovae was thought to be essentially uniform, making them useful "standard candles" in measuring distances in the universe. Such an aberrant Type Ia supernova could throw distances and other scientific work into doubt; however, the light curve characteristics of SN 2003fg were such that it would never have been mistaken for an ordinary high-redshift Type Ia supernova.
