= David A. Frank-Kamenetskii =

Soviet scientist (1910–1970)

- Born: 3 August 1910; Vilna, Russia, (now Vilnius, Lithuania)
- Died: 2 June 1970 (aged 59); Moscow, Soviet Union
- Education: Tomsk Technological Institute
- Known for: Frank-Kamenetskii theory ZFK equation Plasma physics Astrophysics; Activation energy asymptotics
- Spouse(s): Klavdia A. Frank-Kamenetskii née Kopytova (1932–1935); Elena E. Fridman
- Awards: Triple USSR State Prize laureate, Mendeleev Prize (1949), Lenin Order, Order of the Working Red Labour
- Scientific career
- Fields: Physics, chemistry
- Doctoral advisor: Nikolay Nikolaevich Semenov

David Albertovich Frank-Kamenetskii (Russian: Давид Альбертович Франк-Каменецкий, August 3, 1910 – June 2, 1970) was a Soviet theoretical physicist and chemist, professor and doctor of physical, chemical and mathematical sciences. He developed the thermal explosion theory, worked on plasma physics problems and in astrophysics.

== Life ==
David A. Frank-Kamenetskii was born on 1910, August 3 in Vilna (Russia; now Vilnius, Lithuania) in a Jewish family. His parents were Albert G. Frank-Kamenetskii (1873–1935) and Anna A. Frank-Kamenetskii (née Hannah A. Arons; 1883–1948). In 1917–1918, the family left Vilna, spent one year near Moscow and finally resided in Irkutsk (Eastern Siberia), where Albert G. Frank-Kamenetskii became the chair of the Chemistry Department in the newly organized Irkutsk State University. In 1931, Frank-Kamenetskii graduated from the Siberian Technological Institute (now Tomsk Polytechnic University, Tomsk, Russia) in Metallurgy Engineering.

In 1932, he married Klavdia A. Kopytova and in the same year their daughter Tema was born. From 1931 to 1934, Frank-Kamenetskii worked as a mining engineer in the Chita gold mines in Eastern Siberia and he was also teaching in a Chita engineering college.

In 1934, Frank-Kamenetskii wrote a letter to Professor Nikolay Nikolaevich Semenov in Leningrad (now Saint Petersburg, Russia) about chemical thermodynamics. Impressed by the letter, Professor Semenov invited Frank-Kamenetskii to join the Institute of Chemical Physics as a graduate student. The Institute of Chemical Physics of the USSR Academy of Sciences was organized by Professor Semenov in 1931, in Leningrad. From 1934 to 1941, Frank Kamenetskii lived in Leningrad and worked in the Institute of Chemical Physics. Here he met Yakov Borisovich Zel'dovich, who became a close friend, and a fruitful collaboration began. He published several chemical papers in the topics of chain reactions, combustion theory and periodic chemical reactions.

In 1935, Frank-Kamenetskii divorced his first wife Klavdia and married Elena E. Fridman (1910–1992). Their first son was born two years later (Albert D. Frank-Kamentskii, 1937–1979). In 1938, Frank-Kamenetskii received his Candidate of Sciences (CSc) degree (PhD equivalent) in chemistry from the Institute of Chemical Physics.

After the Nazi Germany invasion at the Soviet Union (Operation Barbarossa) in June, 1941, Frank-Kamenetskii and his family was evacuated to Kazan on the Volga River, where the Institute of Chemical Physics was relocated. During the family relocation, the second son, Maxim (1941– ), was born in Gorky. During years 1941 to 1944, he worked in Kazan on the problem of graphite conversion to diamond. In 1943, he received the Doktor Nauk degree (DSc equivalent) in physics and mathematics from the USSR Academy of Sciences.

In 1944–1946, Frank-Kamenetskii lived in Gorky (now Nizhny Novgorod, Russia) and headed the Department of Technical Chemistry of the Gorky State University (now Nizhny Novgorod State University).

In 1947–1948, Frank-Kamenetskii lived in Moscow and worked in the Institute of Chemical Physics. In 1947, he published his major work "Diffusion and Heat Transfer in Chemical Kinetics" in Russian. Between 1948 and 1956, Frank-Kamenetskii lived in Sarov and worked on the Soviet atomic bomb project in the secret military research institute code-named "Arzamas-16" or the "Installation". (In 1993, the Sarov became a sister city to Los Alamos, New Mexico, US).

In 1952, his second daughter, Maria was born and in the same year he suffered a major heart attack. In 1956, Frank-Kamenetskii left the "Installation" for Moscow. Between 1956 and 1970, Frank-Kamenetskii was the head of a laboratory in the I. V. Kurchatov Institute of Atomic Energy and organized and headed the Department of Plasma Physics at the Moscow Institute of Physics and Technology. He was teaching plasma physics and published several major works in plasma physics and biophysics. Between 1960 and 1970, he was the editor of the major Russian popular science magazine, Priroda (Природа, in English: Nature). Frank-Kamenetskii died in Moscow on 2 June 1970 due to a heart failure.

== Significant works ==
- Frank-Kamenetskii, David A. (1947), Diffusion and Heat Transfer in Chemical Kinetics (in Russian), Moscow-Leningrad: USSR Academy of Science Press (other Russian editions: 1967, 1987, NAUKA Press; 2008, Intellekt Press; in German: 1959, Springer-Verlag; in English: 1955, Princeton University Press; 1969, Plenum Press)
- Frank-Kamenetskii, David A. (1948), Energy in Nature and Technology (in Russian), Moscow: KULTPROSVET Press
- Frank-Kamenetskii, David A. (1959), The Formation of Chemical Element's in the Depths of Stars (in Russian), Moscow: ZNANIE Press
- Frank-Kamenetskii, David A. (1959), Physical Processes in Stellar Interiors (in Russian), Moscow: FIZMATGIZ Press (in English: 1962, Israel Program for Scientific Translations)
- Frank-Kamenetskii, David A. (1972) [1961–1963], Plasma-The Fourth State of Matter (3rd ed.), New York: Plenum Press, ISBN 9781468418965
- Frank-Kamenetskii, David A. (1967), Nuclear Astrophysics (in Russian), Moscow: ZNANIE (in English: 1972, Plenum Press; also published in Bulgarian, Polish, Czech, Slovak, German and Japanese)
- Frank-Kamenetskii, David A. (1968) [1964], Lectures on Plasma Physics (in Russian) (2nd ed.), Moscow: ATOMIZDAT (other Russian edition: 2008, Intellekt Press; in German: 1967, DVW; in Polish: 1968, Panstwowe Wydawnictwo Naukowe)
