= Wilhelm Anderson =

Baltic German astronomer and astrophysicist

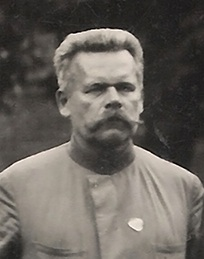
- Wilhelm Anderson in Tartu, c. 1930
- Born: Wilhelm Robert Karl Anderson; 28 October [O.S. 16 October] 1880; Minsk, Minsk Governorate, Russian Empire
- Died: March 26, 1940 (aged 59); Meseritz-Obrawalde, Gau Mark Brandenburg, Deutsches Reich (present-day Międzyrzecz, Lubusz Voivodeship, Poland)
- Education: University of Kazan; University of Tartu
- Known for: Work on the white dwarf mass limit; Stoner-Anderson equation
- Scientific career
- Fields: Astrophysics; Astronomy
- Workplaces: University of Tartu
- Thesis: Die physikalische Natur der Sonnenkorona

Wilhelm Robert Karl Anderson (28 October [O.S. 16 October] 1880 – 26 March 1940) was a Russian-Estonian astrophysicist of Baltic German descent who studied the physical structure of the stars. He is known for being one of the discoverers of the mass limit of white dwarfs.

== Life ==
Wilhelm Anderson was born in Minsk (now in Belarus) into a Baltic German family. His younger brothers were the well known mathematician Oskar Anderson (1887–1960) and the folklorist Walter Anderson (1885–1962). Anderson spent some of his youth in Kazan, where his father Nikolai Anderson (1845–1905) was a university professor for Finno-Ugric languages.

He studied at the University of Kazan, where he graduated from the department of mathematics and science in 1909. Between 1910 and 1920, he worked as a physics teacher first in Samara and then from 1918 in Minsk. Together with his brother Walter Anderson, he moved to Tartu (Estonia) in 1920. At the University of Tartu, he first gained a Masters degree in Astronomy in 1923 and then a Doctorate in 1927. In 1934 he became a habilitation candidate at the university, and in 1936 he received an assistant professorship there, but early in 1939 he suffered a mental breakdown which left him unable to work. Like the majority of Baltic Germans, in January 1940 he was resettled to Germany, where he died in the Sanatorium of Meseritz-Obrawalde, shortly thereafter. It has been suggested that Anderson may have been a victim of the National Socialist "euthanasia" program.

Anderson is probably best known for his work on the mass limit for a white dwarf (one of the final evolutionary states of a star), extending Edmund Stoner's earlier work by relativistic amplification (1929, Tartu), which was in turn further improved by Stoner. The Stoner-Anderson equation of state, a result of Anderson's correspondence with Stoner, is named after him. The white dwarf mass limit was further refined by Subrahmanyan Chandrasekhar and is now known as the Chandrasekhar limit.

== Work (selection) ==
- Über die Existenzmöglichkeit von kosmischem Staube in der Sonnenkorona. Zeitschrift für Physik 28, Berlin, 1924.
- Die physikalische Natur der Sonnenkorona. PhD Thesis published in six parts in Zeitschrift für Physik (in German): I. Z. Phys. 33, 1925, II. Z. Phys. 34, 1925, III. Z. Phys. 35, 1926, IV. Z. Phys. 37, 1926, V. Z. Phys. 38, 1926, VI. Z. Phys. 41, 1927,
- Gewöhnliche Materie und strahlende Energie als verschiedene "Phasen" eines und desselben Grundstoffes. Zeitschrift für Physik 54, Berlin, 1929.
- Über die Grenzdichte der Materie und der Energie. Zeitschrift für Physik 56, Berlin, 1929.

== See also ==
- Ralph H. Fowler
- Ernst Öpik
- Yakov Frenkel
