= SN 2009dc =

Type Ia supernova in Corona Borealis

- Event type: Supernova
- Type Ia
- Date: April 9, 2009
- Instrument: Puckett Observatory
- Constellation: Corona Borealis
- Right ascension: 15^{h} 51^{m} 12.12^{s}
- Declination: +25° 42′ 28.0″
- Epoch: J2000.0
- Distance: 307.7 ± 7.0 Mly (94.33 ± 2.14 Mpc)
- Host: UGC 10063/UGC 10064

SN 2009dc was a Type Ia supernova eruption in the vicinity of galaxy UGC 10064, which is situated in the constellation of Corona Borealis. This lenticular galaxy is located at an estimated distance of 308 million light-years (94 Mpc) from the Milky Way. The event was brighter than normal for a supernova of this class, so it is considered a super-Chandra candidate Type Ia supernova. That is, the progenitor system had a mass greater than the Chandrasekhar limit for a solitary white dwarf.

== Observations ==
This event was reported during April 2009 by T. D. Puckett and associates as part of the Puckett Observatory Supernova Search. The outburst was first recorded on April 9 at an apparent visual magnitude of 16.5. It was located at an offset of 15.8″ west and 20.8″ north of the UGC 10064 galaxy center. Earlier images taken on March 21 showed nothing at this position. A spectrum showed this to be a Type Ia supernova event with an expansion velocity of 8,700 km/s.

Further observation showed the supernova to be extremely luminous, with an absolute magnitude of at least –19.90±0.15. The evolution of the resulting light curve was one of the slowest ever observed. The early spectra showed a prominent carbon feature. All three observations were similar to the super-Chandrasekhar candidate SN 2006gz. However, unlike SN 2006gz, it had an unusually low expansion rate. The spectra suggested a massive layer of unfused carbon and oxygen in the ejecta. Estimates for the expelled ^{56}Ni were 1.2±0.3 M_{☉} to 1.6±0.4 M_{☉}, depending on the level of extinction due to dust in the host galaxy. These results suggested a Type Ia supernova from a super-Chandrasekhar mass white dwarf.

Spectropolarimetric measurements showed the continuum polarization was small, indicating that the explosion had been close to spherically symmetric. Explosion models of this supernova suggested the progenitor white dwarf had a mass of 2.2–2.4 M_{☉}. Several models have been proposed to explain the data, including a rapidly rotating super-Chandra white dwarf, a double white dwarf merger, and a merger between a white dwarf and a donor star that has lost part of its envelope.
