= Yuriko Renardy =

Japanese–American mathematician

Yuriko Yamamuro Renardy is a Japanese–American expert in fluid dynamics who works as a Class Of 1950 Endowed Professor of Mathematics at Virginia Tech.

== Education and career ==
Renardy earned a bachelor's degree from the Australian National University in 1977, and a doctorate in 1981 from the University of Western Australia. Her dissertation, supervised by John J. Mahony, was entitled Water Waves above a Sill.

She worked as a lecturer, researcher, and project coordinator at the University of Wisconsin–Madison and University of Minnesota before joining the Virginia Tech faculty as an assistant professor in 1986. She became the Class Of 1950 Professor in 2000.

== Recognition ==
Renardy was named a Fellow of the American Physical Society in 1997 "for her seminal contributions to the fluid dynamics of interfacial instabilities, through the mathematical analysis of viscous, viscoelastic and thermal effects". She became a fellow of the Institute of Mathematics and its Applications in 2011, and of the Society for Industrial and Applied Mathematics in 2014.
