= Lane–Emden equation =

Dimensionless astrophysics equation

Solutions of Lane–Emden equation for n = 0, 1, 2, 3, 4, 5

In astrophysics, the Lane–Emden equation is a dimensionless form of Poisson's equation for the gravitational potential of a Newtonian self-gravitating, spherically symmetric, polytropic fluid. It is named after astrophysicists Jonathan Homer Lane and Robert Emden. The equation reads

$\frac{1}{\xi^2} \frac{d}{d\xi} \left({\xi^2 \frac{d\theta}{d\xi}}\right) + \theta^n = 0,$

where $\xi$ is a dimensionless radius and $\theta$ is related to the density, and thus the pressure, by $\rho=\rho_c\theta^n$ for central density $\rho_c$. The index $n$ is the polytropic index that appears in the polytropic equation of state,
$$P = K \rho^{1 + \frac{1}{n}}\,$$
where $P$ and $\rho$ are the pressure and density, respectively, and $K$ is a constant of proportionality. The standard boundary conditions are $\theta(0)=1$ and $\theta'(0)=0$. Solutions thus describe the run of pressure and density with radius and are known as polytropes of index $n$. If an isothermal fluid (polytropic index tends to infinity) is used instead of a polytropic fluid, one obtains the Emden–Chandrasekhar equation.

== Applications ==
Physically, hydrostatic equilibrium connects the gradient of the potential, the density, and the gradient of the pressure, whereas Poisson's equation connects the potential with the density. Thus, if we have a further equation that dictates how the pressure and density vary with respect to one another, we can reach a solution. The particular choice of a polytropic gas as given above makes the mathematical statement of the problem particularly succinct and leads to the Lane–Emden equation. The equation is a useful approximation for self-gravitating spheres of plasma such as stars, but typically it is a rather limiting assumption.

== Derivation ==
=== From hydrostatic equilibrium ===
Consider a self-gravitating, spherically symmetric fluid in hydrostatic equilibrium. Mass is conserved and thus described by the continuity equation
$$\frac{dm}{dr} = 4\pi r^2 \rho$$
where $\rho$ is a function of $r$. The equation of hydrostatic equilibrium is
$$\frac{1}{\rho}\frac{dP}{dr} = -\frac{Gm}{r^2}$$
where $m$ is also a function of $r$. Differentiating again gives
$$\begin{align}
\frac{d}{dr}\left(\frac{1}{\rho}\frac{dP}{dr}\right) &= \frac{2Gm}{r^3}-\frac{G}{r^2}\frac{dm}{dr} \\
&=-\frac{2}{\rho r}\frac{dP}{dr}-4\pi G\rho
\end{align}$$
where the continuity equation has been used to replace the mass gradient. Multiplying both sides by $r^2$ and collecting the derivatives of $P$ on the left, one can write
$$r^2\frac{d}{dr}\left(\frac{1}{\rho}\frac{dP}{dr}\right)+\frac{2r}{\rho}\frac{dP}{dr}
= \frac{d}{dr}\left(\frac{r^2}{\rho}\frac{dP}{dr}\right)=-4\pi Gr^2\rho$$

Dividing both sides by $r^2$ yields, in some sense, a dimensional form of the desired equation. If, in addition, we substitute for the polytropic equation of state with $P=K\rho_c^{1+\frac{1}{n}}\theta^{n+1}$ and $\rho=\rho_c\theta^n$, we have
$$\frac{1}{r^2}\frac{d}{dr}\left(r^2K\rho_c^\frac{1}{n}(n+1)\frac{d\theta}{dr}\right)=-4\pi G\rho_c\theta^n$$

Gathering the constants and substituting $r=\alpha\xi$, where
$$\alpha^2=(n+1)K\rho_c^{\frac{1}{n}-1}/4\pi G,$$
we have the Lane–Emden equation,
$$\frac{1}{\xi^2} \frac{d}{d\xi} \left({\xi^2 \frac{d\theta}{d\xi}}\right) + \theta^n = 0$$

=== From Poisson's equation ===
Equivalently, one can start with Poisson's equation,
$$\nabla^2\Phi=\frac{1}{r^2}\frac{d}{dr}\left( r^2\frac{d\Phi}{dr} \right) = 4\pi G\rho$$

One can replace the gradient of the potential using the hydrostatic equilibrium, via
$$\frac{d\Phi}{dr} = -\frac{1}{\rho}\frac{dP}{dr}$$
which again yields the dimensional form of the Lane–Emden equation.

== Exact solutions ==
For a given value of the polytropic index $n$, denote the solution to the Lane–Emden equation as $\theta_n(\xi)$. In general, the Lane–Emden equation must be solved numerically to find $\theta_n$. There are exact, analytic solutions for certain values of $n$, in particular: $n = 0,1,5$. For $n$ between 0 and 5, the solutions are continuous and finite in extent, with the radius of the star given by $R = \alpha \xi_1$, where $\theta_n(\xi_1) = 0$.

For a given solution $\theta_n$, the density profile is given by
$$\rho = \rho_c \theta_n^n .$$

The total mass $M$ of the model star can be found by integrating the density over radius, from 0 to $\xi_1$.

The pressure can be found using the polytropic equation of state, $P = K \rho^{1+\frac{1}{n}}$, i.e.
$$P = K \rho_c^{1+\frac{1}{n}} \theta_n^{n+1}$$

Finally, if the gas is ideal, the equation of state is $P = k_B\rho T/\mu$, where $k_B$ is the Boltzmann constant and $\mu$ the mean molecular weight. The temperature profile is then given by
$$T = \frac{K\mu}{k_B} \rho_c^{1/n} \theta_n$$

In spherically symmetric cases, the Lane–Emden equation is integrable for only three values of the polytropic index $n$.

=== For n = 0 ===
If $n = 0$, the equation becomes
$$\frac{1}{\xi^2} \frac{d}{d\xi} \left( \xi^2 \frac{d\theta}{d\xi} \right) + 1 = 0$$

Re-arranging and integrating once gives
$$\xi^2\frac{d\theta}{d\xi} = C_1-\frac{1}{3}\xi^3$$

Dividing both sides by $\xi^2$ and integrating again gives
$$\theta(\xi)=C_0-\frac{C_1}{\xi}-\frac{1}{6}\xi^2$$

The boundary conditions $\theta(0)=1$ and $\theta'(0)=0$ imply that the constants of integration are $C_0 = 1$ and $C_1 = 0$. Therefore,
$$\theta(\xi) = 1 - \frac{1}{6}\xi^2$$

=== For n = 1 ===
When $n = 1$, the equation can be expanded in the form
$$\frac{d^2\theta}{d\xi^2}+\frac{2}{\xi}\frac{d\theta}{d\xi} + \theta = 0$$

One assumes a power series solution:
$$\theta(\xi) = \sum_{n=0}^\infty a_n \xi^n$$

This leads to a recursive relationship for the expansion coefficients:
$$a_{n+2} = -\frac{a_n}{(n+3)(n+2)}$$

This relation can be solved leading to the general solution:
$$\theta(\xi)=a_0 \frac{\sin\xi}{\xi} + a_1 \frac{\cos\xi}{\xi}$$

The boundary condition for a physical polytrope demands that $\theta(\xi) \rightarrow 1$ as $\xi \rightarrow 0$. This requires that $a_0 = 1, a_1 = 0$, thus leading to the solution:
$$\theta(\xi)=\frac{\sin\xi}{\xi}$$

=== For n = 2 ===
This exact solution was found by accident when searching for zero values of the related TOV Equation.

We consider a series expansion around $\theta=0$
$$\theta = \sum\limits_{m=0}^\infty a_m \xi^m$$
with initial values $\theta|_{\xi=0}=\theta_0$ and $\left.\frac{d\theta}{d\xi}\right|_{\xi=0}=0$. Plugging this into the Lane–Emden equation, we can show that all odd coefficients of the series vanish $a_{2m+1}=0$. Furthermore, we obtain a recursive relationship between the even coefficients $b_m=a_{2m}$ of the series.
$$b_{m+1} = - \frac{1}{(2m+2)(2m+3)}\sum\limits_{k=0}^m b_{m-k}b_k$$
The series converges for $\xi\lesssim 15.7179$.

=== For n = 5 ===
We start from with the Lane–Emden equation:
$$\frac1{\xi^2} {\frac{d}{d\xi}} \left(\xi^2\frac{d\theta}{d\xi}\right) + \theta^5 = 0$$

Rewriting for $\frac{d\theta}{d\xi}$ produces:
$$\frac{d\theta} {d\xi} = \frac1 2 \left(1+\frac{\xi^2}{3}\right)^{3/2} \frac{2\xi} 3 = \frac {\xi^3}{3 \left[ 1+\frac {\xi^2} 3 \right]^{3/2}}$$

Differentiating with respect to ξ leads to:
$$\theta^5 =\frac{\xi^2}{\left[1+\frac{\xi^2}{3}\right]^{3/2}} + \frac{3\xi^2}{9\left[1+\frac{\xi^2}3\right]^{5/2}} = \frac 9 {9\left[1+\frac{\xi^2}3\right]^{5/2}}$$

Reduced, we come by:
$$\theta^5 = \frac 1 { \left[ 1+\frac{\xi^2}3 \right]^{5/2}}$$

Therefore, the Lane–Emden equation has the solution
$$\theta(\xi) = \frac 1 {\sqrt{1+\xi^2/3}}$$
when $n = 5$. This solution is finite in mass but infinite in radial extent, and therefore the complete polytrope does not represent a physical solution. Chandrasekhar believed for a long time that finding other solution for $n=5$ "is complicated and involves elliptic integrals".

==== Srivastava's solution ====
In 1962, Sambhunath Srivastava found an explicit solution when $n=5$. His solution is given by
$$\theta = \frac{\sin(\ln \sqrt \xi)}{\sqrt{3\xi-2\xi \sin^2 (\ln \sqrt\xi)}},$$
and from this solution, a family of solutions $\theta(\xi)\rightarrow \sqrt A\, \theta(A\xi)$ can be obtained using homology transformation. Since this solution does not satisfy the conditions at the origin (in fact, it is oscillatory with amplitudes growing indefinitely as the origin is approached), this solution can be used in composite stellar models.

== Analytic solutions ==
In applications, the main role play analytic solutions that are expressible by the convergent power series expanded around some initial point. Typically the expansion point is $\xi=0$, which is also a singular point (fixed singularity) of the equation, and there is provided some initial data $\theta(0)$ at the centre of the star. One can prove that the equation has the convergent power series/analytic solution around the origin of the form
$$\theta(\xi) = \theta(0) - \frac{\theta(0)^{n}}{6} \xi^{2} + O(\xi^{3}),\quad  \xi \approx 0.$$

Numerical solution for analytical solution of the Lane-Emden equation in the complex plane for $n=5$, $\theta(0)=2$. Two movable singularities on the imaginary axis are visible. They limit the radius of convergence of the analytical solution around the origin. For different values of initial data and $p$ the location of singularities is different, yet they are located symmetrically on the imaginary axis.

The radius of convergence of this series is limited due to existence of two singularities on the imaginary axis in the complex plane. These singularities are located symmetrically with respect to the origin. Their position change when we change equation parameters and the initial condition $\theta(0)$, and therefore, they are called movable singularities due to classification of the singularities of non-linear ordinary differential equations in the complex plane by Paul Painlevé. A similar structure of singularities appears in other non-linear equations that result from the reduction of the Laplace operator in spherical symmetry, e.g., Isothermal Sphere equation.

Analytic solutions can be extended along the real line by analytic continuation procedure resulting in the full profile of the star or molecular cloud cores. Two analytic solutions with the overlapping circles of convergence can also be matched on the overlap to the larger domain solution, which is a commonly used method of construction of profiles of required properties.

The series solution is also used in the numerical integration of the equation. It is used to shift the initial data for analytic solution slightly away from the origin since at the origin the numerical methods fail due to the singularity of the equation.

== Numerical solutions ==
In general, solutions are found by numerical integration. Many standard methods require that the problem is formulated as a system of first-order ordinary differential equations. For example,

$$\begin{align}
& \frac{d\theta}{d\xi}=-\frac{\varphi}{\xi^2} \\[6pt]
& \frac{d\varphi}{d\xi}=\theta^n\xi^2
\end{align}$$

Here, $\varphi(\xi)$ is interpreted as the dimensionless mass, defined by $m(r) = 4\pi\alpha^3\rho_c\varphi(\xi)$. The relevant initial conditions are $\varphi(0) = 0$ and $\theta(0) = 1$. The first equation represents hydrostatic equilibrium and the second represents mass conservation.

== Homologous variables ==
=== Homology-invariant equation ===
It is known that if $\theta(\xi)$ is a solution of the Lane–Emden equation, then so is $C^{2/n+1}\theta(C\xi)$. Solutions that are related in this way are called homologous; the process that transforms them is homology. If one chooses variables that are invariant to homology, then we can reduce the order of the Lane–Emden equation by one.

A variety of such variables exist. A suitable choice is
$$U=\frac{d\log m}{d\log r}=\frac{\xi^3\theta^n} \varphi$$
and
$$V = \frac{d\log P}{d\log r}=(n+1)\frac \varphi {\xi\theta}$$

We can differentiate the logarithms of these variables with respect to $\xi$, which gives
$$\frac{1}{U} \frac{dU}{d\xi} = \frac 1 \xi \left(3 - n(n+1)^{-1}V - U \right)$$
and
$$\frac{1}{V} \frac{dV}{d\xi} = \frac 1 \xi \left(-1 + U + (n+1)^{-1}V \right).$$

Finally, we can divide these two equations to eliminate the dependence on $\xi$, which leaves
$$\frac{dV}{dU} = -\frac{V}{U}\left(\frac{U+(n+1)^{-1}V-1}{U+n(n+1)^{-1}V-3}\right).$$

This is now a single first-order equation.

=== Topology of the homology-invariant equation ===
The homology-invariant equation can be regarded as the autonomous pair of equations
$$\frac{dU}{d\log\xi} = -U \left(U+n(n+1)^{-1}V-3\right)$$
and
$$\frac{dV}{d\log\xi} = V \left(U+(n+1)^{-1}V-1\right).$$

The behaviour of solutions to these equations can be determined by linear stability analysis. The critical points of the equation (where $dV/d\log\xi = dU/d\log\xi = 0$) and the eigenvalues and eigenvectors of the Jacobian matrix are tabulated below.

| Critical point | Eigenvalues | Eigenvectors |
|---|---|---|
| $(0,0)$ | $3, -1$ | $(1,0), (0,1)$ |
| $(3,0)$ | $-3,2$ | $(1,0), (-3n,5+5n)$ |
| $(0,n+1)$ | $1, 3-n$ | $(0,1), (2-n,1+n)$ |
| $\left(\dfrac{n-3}{n-1},2\dfrac{n+1}{n-1}\right)$ | $\dfrac{n-5\pm\Delta_n}{2-2n}$ | $(1-n\mp\Delta_n,4+4n)$ |

== See also ==
- Emden–Chandrasekhar equation
- Chandrasekhar's white dwarf equation
