= Jonathan Homer Lane =

American astrophysicist and inventor

- Born: August 9, 1819; Geneseo, New York
- Died: May 3, 1880 (aged 60); Washington, D.C.
- Education: Yale University
- Known for: Lane–Emden equation
- Scientific career
- Fields: astrophysics

Jonathan Homer Lane (August 9, 1819 – May 3, 1880) was an American astrophysicist and inventor.

== Biography ==
Lane's parents were Mark and Henrietta (née Tenny) Lane and his education was at the Phillips Exeter Academy in Exeter, New Hampshire. He graduated from Yale University in 1846. While at Yale, Lane studied under astronomer Denison Olmsted. Olmsted’s interest in meteorology, particularly his support for James P. Espy’s thermodynamic model of storms, appear to closely parallel Lane’s later scientific interests and may have influenced him in that direction.

Lane worked for the U.S. Patent Office, and became a principal examiner in 1851, continuing in that position until forced out by a change of political administrations in 1857. From 1860 to 1866, he lived with his brother, a blacksmith, in Franklin, Pennsylvania. During that time, he actively worked on developing an improved "cold apparatus" with which he hoped to reach temperatures as low as -345 °F (-209 °C), building on the work of Sir William Siemens. In 1869 he joined the Office of Weights and Measures, a part of the Department of the Treasury that later became the National Bureau of Standards.

Lane was particularly interested in astronomy, and was the first to perform a mathematical analysis of the Sun as a gaseous body. His investigations demonstrated the thermodynamic relations between pressure, temperature, and density of the gas within the Sun, and formed the foundation of what would in the future become the theory of stellar evolution (see Lane-Emden equation).

Simon Newcomb, in his memoirs, describes Lane as "an odd-looking and odd-mannered little man, rather intellectual in appearance, who listened attentively to what others said, but who, so far as I noticed, never said a word himself." Newcomb recounts his own role in bringing Lane's work, in 1876, to the attention of William Thomson who further popularized the work. Newcomb notes, "it is very singular that a man of such acuteness never achieved anything else of significance."

The crater Lane on the Moon is named after him.

== Published works ==
- "On the theoretical temperature of the Sun, under the hypothesis of a gaseous mass maintaining its volume by its internal heat, and depending on the laws of gases as known to terrestrial experiment". American Journal of Science. 2. 50 (148): 57–74. 1870. Bibcode:1870AmJS...50...57L. doi:10.2475/ajs.s2-50.148.57. ISSN 0002-9599. S2CID 131102972.
