= Liouville space =

In the mathematical physics of quantum mechanics, Liouville space, also known as line space, is the space of operators on Hilbert space. Liouville space is itself a Hilbert space under the Hilbert-Schmidt inner product.

Abstractly, Liouville space is equivalent (isometrically isomorphic) to the tensor product of a Hilbert space with its dual. A common computational technique to organize computations in Liouville space is vectorization.

Liouville space underlies the density operator formalism and is a common computation technique in the study of open quantum systems.
