= Tikhov (lunar crater) =

Crater on the Moon

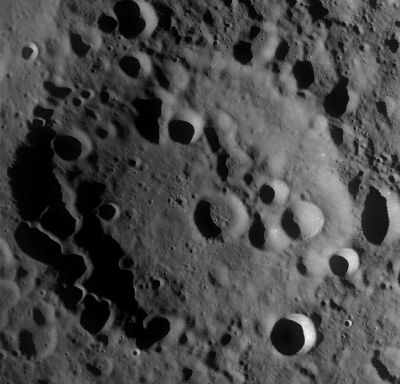
- LRO image
- Coordinates: 62.3°N 171.7°E
- Diameter: 83 km
- Depth: 4.00 km (2.49 mi)
- Colongitude: 190° at sunrise
- Formation: Nectarian
- Eponym: Gavriil A. Tikhov

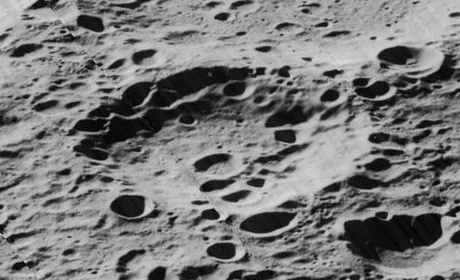
Oblique Lunar Orbiter 5 image, facing west

Tikhov is an eroded lunar impact crater on the Moon's far side. It is nearly attached to the east-southeastern outer rim of the larger crater Avogadro. About one crater diameter the east-northeast of Tikhov is the equally worn crater Emden, and to south-southeast lies the younger Tsinger.

This formation dates to the Nectarian period on the lunar geologic timescale. It has been battered by subsequent impacts, leaving a series of smaller craters along the rim, inner wall, and floor of the crater. The most recent of these impacts are several small, cup-shaped craters along the eastern rim and inner wall and floor. As a result of this wear, the outer rim is rounded and uneven, although the circular nature of the rim can still be discerned.

== See also ==
- Asteroid 2251 Tikhov
