= Daniel D. Joseph =

American mechanical engineer

Daniel Donald Joseph (March 26, 1929 – May 24, 2011) was an American mechanical engineer. He was the Regents Professor Emeritus and Russell J. Penrose Professor Emeritus of Department of Aerospace Engineering and Mechanics at the University of Minnesota. He was widely known for his research in fluid dynamics.

== Academic career ==
Joseph received his Masters in Sociology from the University of Chicago in 1950. He received his B.S. (1959), M.S. (1960), and Ph.D. (1963) degrees in Mechanical Engineering from the Illinois Institute of Technology. Joseph started his academic career as an Assistant Professor of Mechanical Engineering at Illinois Institute of Technology in 1962. In the following year he joined University of Minnesota as an Assistant Professor of Aerospace Engineering and Mechanics. He was named full Professor in 1968.

Joseph's interests included stability of fluid flow, irrotational motions of viscous and viscoelastic fluids, and direct numerical simulations of solid–liquid flows. He has been listed as an ISI Highly Cited Author in Engineering by the ISI Web of Knowledge, Thomson Scientific Company.

== Honors and awards ==
- G. I. Taylor Medal, Society of Engineering Science, 1990
- Member of the National Academy of Engineering, 1990
- Member of the National Academy of Sciences, 1991
- Bingham Medal of the Society of Rheology, 1993
- Fellow of the American Academy of Arts and Sciences, 1993
- Timoshenko Medal, 1995
- Fluid Dynamics Prize, American Physical Society, 1999

== Books ==
- 1976: Stability of Fluid Motions, I and II, Springer-Verlag, New York ISBN 978-0-471-11621-9
- 1993: (wilth Y. Renardy) Fundamentals of Two-Fluid Dynamics. Part 1: Mathematical Theory and Applications, Springer-Verlag, New York
- 1993: (with Y. Renardy) Fundamentals of Two-Fluid Dynamics: Part 2: Lubricated Transport, Drops and Miscible Liquids, Springer-Verlag, New York ISBN 978-0-387-97910-6
- 1997: Elementary Stability and Bifurcation Theory, 2nd ed., Springer ISBN 978-0-387-97068-4
- 2007: Fluid Dynamics of Viscoelastic Liquids, Springer (2007). ISBN 978-0-387-97155-1
- 2007: (with Funada, T., and Wang, J.) Potential Flows of Viscous and Viscoelastic Liquids, Cambridge University Press ISBN 978-0-521-87337-6
