= Polytropic process =

Thermodynamic process

A polytropic process is a thermodynamic process that obeys the relation:
$$p V^{n} = C$$

where p is the pressure, V is volume, n is the polytropic index, and C is a constant. The polytropic process equation describes expansion and compression processes which include heat transfer.

== Particular cases ==
Some specific values of n correspond to particular cases:

- $n=0$ for an isobaric process,
- $n=+\infty$ for an isochoric process.

In addition, when the ideal gas law applies:

- $n=1$ for an isothermal process,
- $n=\gamma$ for an isentropic process.

Where $\gamma$ is the ratio of the heat capacity at constant pressure ($C_P$) to heat capacity at constant volume ($C_V$).

== Equivalence between the polytropic coefficient and the ratio of energy transfers ==
Polytropic processes behave differently with various polytropic indices. A polytropic process can generate other basic thermodynamic processes.

For an ideal gas in a closed system undergoing a slow process with negligible changes in kinetic and potential energy the process is polytropic, such that
$$p v^{(1- \gamma)K + \gamma} = C$$
where C is a constant, $K = \frac{\delta q}{\delta w}$, $\gamma = \frac{c_p}{c_v}$, and with the polytropic coefficient $n = {(1- \gamma)K + \gamma}$.

== Relationship to ideal processes ==
For certain values of the polytropic index, the process will be synonymous with other common processes. Some examples of the effects of varying index values are given in the following table.

Variation of polytropic index n
Polytropic index	Relation	Effects
n < 0	—	Negative exponents reflect a process where work and heat flow simultaneously in or out of the system. In the absence of forces except pressure, such a spontaneous process is not allowed by the second law of thermodynamics; however, negative exponents can be meaningful in some special cases not dominated by thermal interactions, such as in the processes of certain plasmas in astrophysics, or if there are other forms of energy (e.g. chemical energy) involved during the process (e.g. explosion).
n = 0	$p=C$	Equivalent to an isobaric process (constant pressure)
n = 1	$pV=C$	Equivalent to an isothermal process (constant temperature), under the assumption of ideal gas law, since then $pV=nRT$.
1 < n < γ	—	Under the assumption of ideal gas law, heat and work flows go in opposite directions (K > 0), such as in vapor compression refrigeration during compression, where the elevated vapour temperature resulting from the work done by the compressor on the vapour leads to some heat loss from the vapour to the cooler surroundings.
n = γ	—	Equivalent to an isentropic process (adiabatic and reversible, no heat transfer), under the assumption of ideal gas law.
γ < n < ∞	—	Under the assumption of ideal gas law, heat and work flows go in the same direction (K < 0), such as in an internal combustion engine during the power stroke, where heat is lost from the hot combustion products, through the cylinder walls, to the cooler surroundings, at the same time as those hot combustion products push on the piston.
n = +∞	$V=C$	Equivalent to an isochoric process (constant volume)

When the index n is between any two of the former values (0, 1, γ, or ∞), it means that the polytropic curve will cut through (be bounded by) the curves of the two bounding indices.

For an ideal gas, 1 < γ < 5/3, since by Mayer's relation
$$\gamma = \frac{c_p}{c_v} = \frac{c_v+R}{c_v} = 1+\frac{R}{c_v} = \frac{c_p}{c_p-R}.$$

== Other ==
A solution to the Lane–Emden equation using a polytropic fluid is known as a polytrope.

The term "polytropic poison" has been used exclusively in publications from Russia regarding lead poisoning and chloroprene to indicate multisystemic toxic effects.

In entomology it has been used to denote insects visiting various flowers for nectar.

== See also ==
- Adiabatic process
- Compressor
- Internal combustion engine
- Isentropic process
- Isobaric process
- Isochoric process
- Isothermal process
- Polytrope
- Quasistatic equilibrium
- Thermodynamics
- Vapor-compression refrigeration
