= Thomas S. Lundgren =

American fluid dynamicist (born 1935)

Thomas S. Lundgren is an American fluid dynamicist and professor emeritus of Aerospace Engineering and Mechanics at the University of Minnesota He is known for his work in the field of theoretical fluid dynamics. In 2006, Lundgren received Fluid Dynamics Prize by the American Physical Society "for his insightful theoretical contributions to numerous areas of fluid mechanics, most notably in the fields of turbulence and vortex dynamics"

Lundgren received his B.S. and M.S. degrees in Aeronautical Engineering from University of Minnesota in 1954 and 1956 respectively. He then received his Ph.D. in fluid mechanics from the same institute in 1960. Lundgren is a Fellow of American Physical Society since 1994.

== See also ==
- Probability density function methods for turbulence
