= Bonnet's theorem =

Theorem in classical mechanics

In classical mechanics, Bonnet's theorem states that if n different force fields each produce the same geometric orbit (say, an ellipse of given dimensions) albeit with different speeds v_{1}, v_{2},...,v_{n} at a given point P, then the same orbit will be followed if the speed at point P equals

$$v_{\mathrm{combined}} = \sqrt{v_{1}^{2} + v_{2}^{2} + \cdots + v_{n}^{2}}$$

== History ==
This theorem was first derived by Adrien-Marie Legendre in 1817, but it is named after Pierre Ossian Bonnet.

== Derivation ==
The shape of an orbit is determined only by the centripetal forces at each point of the orbit, which are the forces acting perpendicular to the orbit. By contrast, forces along the orbit change only the speed, but not the direction, of the velocity.

Let the instantaneous radius of curvature at a point P on the orbit be denoted as R. For the k^{th} force field that produces that orbit, the force normal to the orbit F_{k} must provide the centripetal force

$$F_{k} = \frac{m}{R} v_{k}^{2}$$

Adding all these forces together yields the equation

$$\sum_{k=1}^{n} F_{k} = \frac{m}{R} \sum_{k=1}^{n} v_{k}^{2}$$

Hence, the combined force-field produces the same orbit if the speed at a point P is set equal to

$$v_{\mathrm{combined}} = \sqrt{v_{1}^{2} + v_{2}^{2} + \cdots + v_{n}^{2}}$$
