= Polytrope =

Thermodynamic concept imporant in astrophysics

The normalized density as a function of scale length for a wide range of polytropic indices

In astrophysics, a polytrope is a thermodynamic system with pressure dependent upon density, leaving only one independent state variable. A polytropic process is intermediate between an isothermal process and adiabatic one. The dependence of pressure on density is a solution to the Lane–Emden equation:
$$P = K \rho^{(n+1)/n} = K \rho^{1 + 1/n},$$
where P is pressure, ρ is density and K is a constant of proportionality. The constant n is known as the polytropic index.

This relation need not be interpreted as an equation of state, which states P as a function of both ρ and T (the temperature); however in the particular case described by the polytrope equation there are other additional relations between these three quantities, which together determine the equation. Thus, this is simply a relation that expresses an assumption about the change of pressure with radius in terms of the change of density with radius, yielding a solution to the Lane–Emden equation.

Sometimes the word polytrope may refer to an equation of state that looks similar to the thermodynamic relation above. It is preferable to refer to the fluid itself (as opposed to the solution of the Lane–Emden equation) as a polytropic fluid or polytropic gas. Specifically, the polytropic gas is a gas for which the specific heat is constant. The equation of state of a polytropic fluid is general enough that such idealized fluids find wide use outside of the limited problem of polytropes.

The polytropic exponent (of a polytrope) has been shown to be equivalent to the pressure derivative of the bulk modulus where its relation to the Murnaghan equation of state has also been demonstrated. The polytrope relation is therefore best suited for relatively low-pressure (below 10^{7} Pa) and high-pressure (over 10^{14} Pa) conditions when the pressure derivative of the bulk modulus, which is equivalent to the polytrope index, is near constant.

== Example models by polytropic index ==
Density (normalized to average density) versus radius (normalized to external radius) for a polytrope with index n=3.

- An index n = 0 polytrope is often used to model rocky planets. The reason is that n = 0 polytrope has constant density, i.e., incompressible interior. This is a zero order approximation for rocky (solid/liquid) planets.
- Neutron stars are well modeled by polytropes with index between n = 0.5 and n = 1.
- A polytrope with index n = 1.5 is a good model for fully convective star cores (like those of red giants), brown dwarfs, giant gaseous planets (like Jupiter). With this index, the polytropic exponent is 5/3, which is the heat capacity ratio (γ) for monatomic gas. For the interior of gaseous stars (consisting of either ionized hydrogen or helium), this follows from an ideal gas approximation for natural convection conditions.
- A polytrope with index n = 1.5 is also a good model for white dwarfs of low mass, according to the equation of state of non-relativistic degenerate matter.
- A polytrope with index n = 3 is a good model for the cores of white dwarfs of higher masses, according to the equation of state of relativistic degenerate matter.
- A polytrope with index n = 3 is usually also used to model main-sequence stars like the Sun, at least in the radiation zone, corresponding to the Eddington standard model of stellar structure.
- A polytrope with index n = 5 has an infinite radius. It corresponds to the simplest plausible model of a self-consistent stellar system, first studied by Arthur Schuster in 1883, and it has an exact solution.
- A polytrope with index n = ∞ corresponds to what is called an isothermal sphere, that is an isothermal self-gravitating sphere of gas, whose structure is identical to the structure of a collisionless system of stars like a globular cluster. This is because for an ideal gas, the temperature is proportional to ρ^{1/n}, so infinite n corresponds to a constant temperature.

In general as the polytropic index increases, the density distribution is more heavily weighted toward the center (r = 0) of the body.

== See also ==
- Polytropic process
- Equation of state
- Murnaghan equation of state
