= Joseph Liouville =

French mathematician (1809–1882)

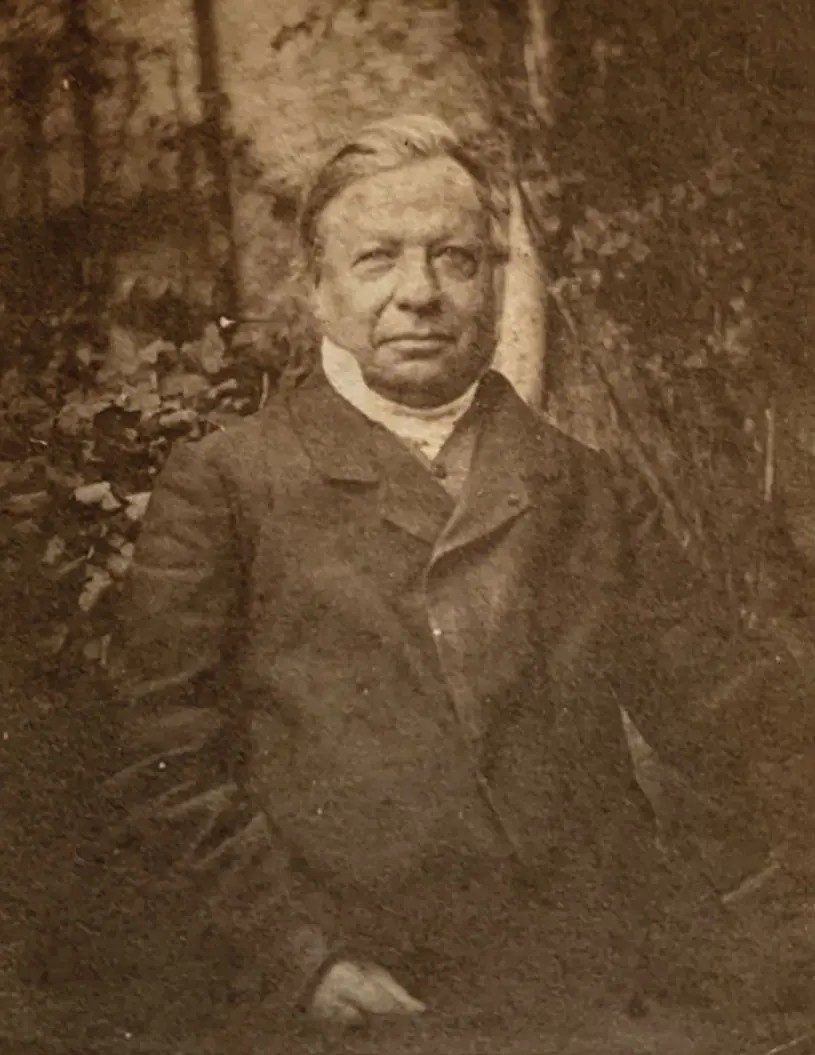
- Liouville in 1868
- Born: 24 March 1809; Saint-Omer, First French Empire
- Died: 8 September 1882 (aged 73); Paris, French Third Republic
- Education: École Polytechnique
- Known for: Full list
- Scientific career
- Fields: Mathematics; physics
- Workplaces: École Centrale Paris; École Polytechnique
- Thesis: Sur le développement des fonctions ou parties de fonctions en séries de sinus et de cosinus, dont on fait usage dans un grand nombre de questions de mécanique et de physique (1836)
- Doctoral advisor: Siméon Denis Poisson
- Other academic advisors: Louis Jacques Thénard
- Doctoral students: Eugène Charles Catalan
- Other notable students: Charles Hermite

Joseph Liouville (/ˌliːuˈvɪl/ LEE-oo-VIL; French: [ʒozɛf ljuvil]; 24 March 1809 – 8 September 1882) was a French mathematician who worked on a number of different fields in mathematics, including number theory, complex analysis, and mathematical physics. Many mathematical concepts are named after him, including Liouville's theorem in Hamiltonian mechanics and Liouville's theorem for complex numbers.

== Life and work ==
He was born in Saint-Omer in France on 24 March 1809. His parents were Claude-Joseph Liouville (an army officer) and Thérèse Liouville (née Balland).

Liouville gained admission to the École Polytechnique in 1825 and graduated in 1827. Just like Augustin-Louis Cauchy before him, Liouville studied engineering at École des Ponts et Chaussées after graduating from the École Polytechnique, but opted instead for a career in mathematics. After some years as an assistant at various institutions including the École Centrale Paris, he was appointed as professor at the École Polytechnique in 1838. He began delivering lectures on mathematics at the Collège de France in 1851 and secured a chair in rational mechanics at the Faculté des Sciences in 1857. However, he suffered under a heavy teaching load and his health started to deteriorate.

Liouville founded the Journal de Mathématiques Pures et Appliquées in 1836, basing it on Crelle's Journal. It soon became a leading mathematical periodical in France and became known as "Liouville's Journal" even after he had resigned as editor-in-chief in 1875. He was elected to the French Academy of Sciences in 1839, and became an associate member of the Bureau des Longitudes.

Liouville was also involved in politics for some time, and he became a member of the Constituting Assembly following the 1848 Revolution. However, following the rise of Napoleon III to power, Liouville ended his political activities.

In 1851, he was elected a foreign member of the Royal Swedish Academy of Sciences. In 1853, he was elected as a member of the American Philosophical Society. As a mathematician, he maintained contact with many foreign colleagues, including William Thomson (Lord Kelvin), Carl Gustav Jacob Jacobi, and Peter Gustav Lejeune Dirichlet. As a lecturer, he offered support and encouragement to many young talents, among them, Charles Hermite, Joseph Bertrand, and Joseph-Alfred Serret.

== Contributions ==
=== Analysis, algebra, and number theory ===
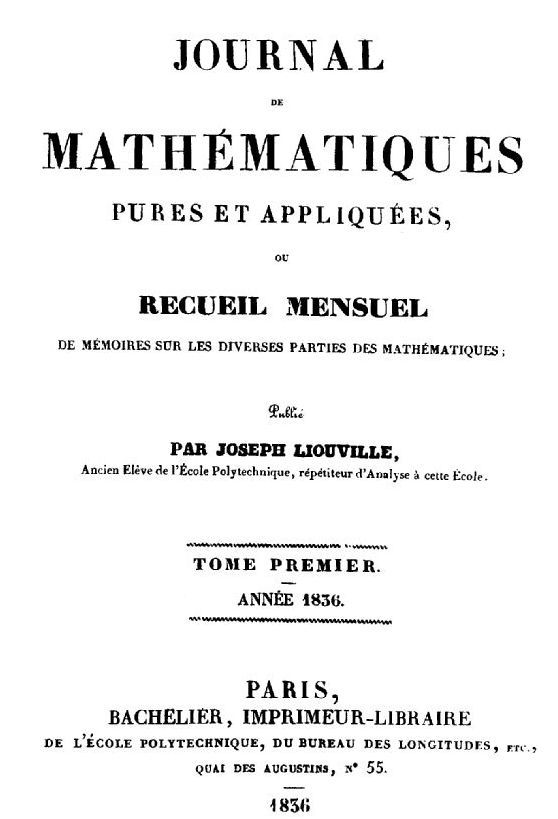
Title page of the first volume of Journal de Mathématiques Pures et Appliquées in 1836.

In 1835, Liouville established the existence of non-elementary integrals and a criterion for integration in finite terms, that is, in terms of elementary functions. He gave an example of such a non-elementary integral, $\int \frac{e^x}{x} \, dx$.

In 1838, Liouville published a method for establishing the existence of solutions to ordinary differential equations of the second order involving successive approximations, now attached to the name of Émile Picard, who gave a more general approach in the early 1890s.

In algebra, Liouville was one of the first to grasp the significance of the contributions of the late Évariste Galois, whose work had been forwarded to him by Auguste Chevalier, a friend of Galois. Liouville edited and published the work of Galois in his own journal in 1846, after which the Galois theory attracted the attention of many mathematicians, among them, Paolo Ruffini, Joseph-Alfred Serret, and Augustin-Louis Cauchy. By helping to popularize the works of Galois, Liouville participated, albeit indirectly, in the development of modern algebra in general and group theory in particular.

Research on the solutions of algebraic equations spurred interest in algebraic and transcendental irrational numbers. In 1844, Liouville was the first to prove the existence of transcendental numbers. He did so by demonstrating some results on approximating algebraic irrationals using rational numbers and established an inequality that served as a criterion for transcendence. In essence, his inequality proclaims that rationals are poor approximations of irrational algebraic numbers. He then gave an explicit example. He showed that any number of the form

$\frac{a_1}{10} + \frac{a_2}{10^{2!}} + \frac{a_3}{10^{3!}} + \cdots,$

where the $a_i$ are integers from 0 to 9, is transcendental. Future demonstrations of the transcendence of Euler's number $e$ by Charles Hermite and of $\pi$ (pi) by Ferdinand von Lindemann were based on Liouville's contributions.

The Liouville function, an important concept in number theory, is named in his honor.

In his work on elliptic integrals, he based the whole subject on the general properties of doubly periodic functions and he demonstrated the transcendence of Abelian functions. It was in this context that he discovered Liouville's theorem in complex analysis, bounded entire functions are constant. He also gave a short proof of the fundamental theorem of algebra.

A similar result is Liouville's theorem for harmonic functions, or solutions to Laplace's equation. It states that bounded harmonic functions in Euclidean space are constant. Edward Nelson gave a short proof in 1961, exploiting the mean-value property of harmonic functions.

=== Mathematical physics ===
Since the mid-eighteenth century, mathematicians and physicists had been studying a variety of partial differential equations with boundary values using the separation of variables to resolve them into systems of ordinary differential equations, which carried their own parameters. Solutions found for specific values of these parameters, called eigenvalues, were known as eigenfunctions. The separation of variables in different coordinate systems led to new special functions, such as the Bessel functions and Legendre polynomials, as eigenfunctions of ordinary differential equations. Liouville and his friend, Jacques Charles François Sturm, sought to tackle the general problem for any linear differential equations of the second order. In a series papers published in the 1830s, the two men established the Sturm–Liouville theory. Though the significance of this contribution took some time for mathematicians to grasp, it is now a standard procedure to solve certain types of integral equations. Their work was inspired by the analysis of heat diffusion in a cylinder by Jean-Baptiste Joseph Fourier, and may be viewed as a generalization of Fourier analysis. In its original formulation, the Sturm–Liouville theory was not fully rigorous in that it did not adequately address the completeness of the set of eigenfunctions (or orthogonal basis set) and the convergence of the expansion in terms of the eigenfunctions. These issues were subsequently addressed by mathematicians such as Maxime Bôcher, Max Mason, and Garrett Birkhoff.

Independent of Niels Henrik Abel, Liouville studied special integral equations and employed a method of successive substitutions, anticipating Carl Neumann by a few decades. However, his contributions in this domain were subsequently subsumed by the work of Vito Volterra, a pioneer of the general theory of integral equations. Liouville's research on the Sturm–Liouville theory and linear integral equations constituted early advances in the study of functional analysis.

In 1837, Liouville sought approximate solutions to linear second-order differential equations with spatially varying coefficients and obtained, in modern language, an asymptotic series. George Green independently found this technique in the same year in a paper on water waves in a canal. The Liouville–Green method was rediscovered in 1923 by Harold Jeffreys, and again in 1926 by Gregor Wentzel, Hans Kramers, Léon Brillouin, who were studying the Schrödinger equation of quantum mechanics.

An animation illustrating Liouville's theorem for simple harmonic motion. The area of the phase-space portrait is constant.

Liouville was attracted to the study of mechanics thanks to the works of William Rowan Hamilton and Carl Gustav Jacob Jacobi. Liouville proved in a 1838 paper on differential equations that phase space volume of a conservative mechanical system constant, a result now known as Liouville's theorem in Hamiltonian mechanics. Following Josiah Willard Gibbs, Liouville's theorem is recognized a fundamental result for statistical mechanics. In a related context, Liouville introduced the notion of action-angle coordinates as a description of completely integrable systems. The modern formulation of this is sometimes called the Liouville–Arnold theorem, and the underlying concept of integrability is referred to as Liouville integrability.

In his study of electrodynamics, Liouville developed the Riemann–Liouville integral to consider differentiation and integration of a fractional order.

He also studied potential theory and ellipsoidal figures of equilibrium, including those of unequal axes, that is, Jacobi ellipsoids.

His unpublished manuscripts indicated that he had already known of the Rayleigh–Ritz method for approximating the eigenvalues of a boundary-value problem as early as 1845, decades before William Strutt (Lord Rayleigh) introduced it his Theory of Sound (1877).

== Honours and awards ==
The crater Liouville on the Moon is named after him.

== See also ==
- List of things named after Joseph Liouville
- Analytic number theory
