= List of topics named after Leonhard Euler =

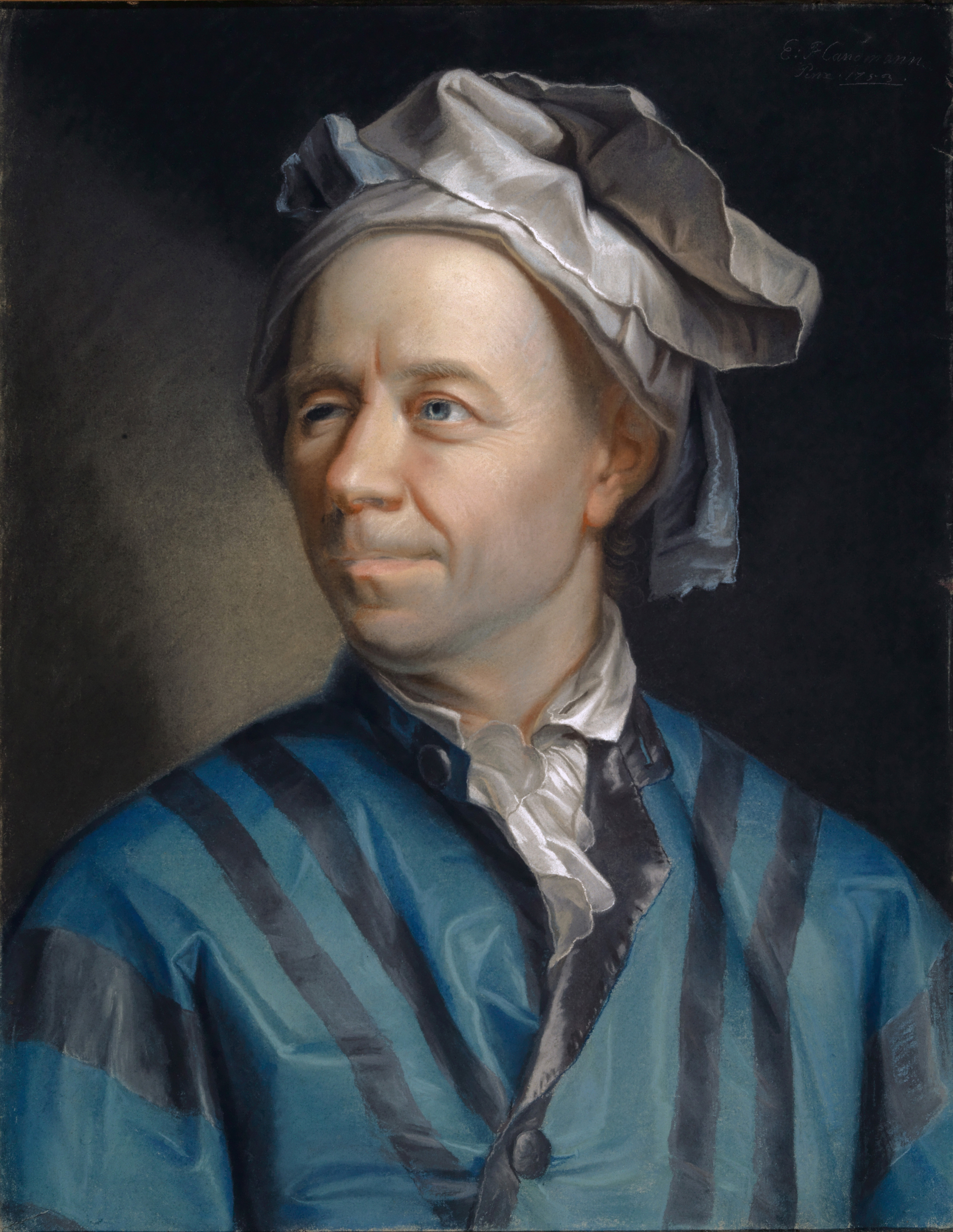
Leonhard Euler (1707–1783)

In mathematics and physics, many topics are named in honor of Swiss mathematician Leonhard Euler (1707–1783), who made many important discoveries and innovations. These include functions, equations, formulas, identities, numbers (single or sequence), or other mathematical entities. Many of these entities have been given simple yet ambiguous names such as Euler's function, Euler's equation, and Euler's formula.

Euler's work touched upon so many fields that he is often the earliest written reference on a given matter. To avoid the confusion that would arise from naming such a large number of properties and theorems after Euler, many of them are conventionally named after the first person to have proved them after him.

== Conjectures ==
- Euler's sum of powers conjecture – disproved for exponents 4 and 5 during the 20th century; unsolved for higher exponents
- Euler's Graeco-Latin square conjecture – proved to be true for $n=6$ and disproved otherwise, during the 20th century

== Equations ==
Usually, Euler's equation refers to one of (or a set of) differential equations (DEs). It is customary to classify them into ODEs and PDEs.

Otherwise, Euler's equation may refer to a non-differential equation, as in these three cases:

- Euler–Lotka equation, a characteristic equation employed in mathematical demography
- Euler's pump and turbine equation
- Euler transform used to accelerate the convergence of an alternating series and is also frequently applied to the hypergeometric series

=== Ordinary differential equations ===
- Euler rotation equations, a set of first-order ODEs concerning the rotations of a rigid body.
- Euler–Cauchy equation, a linear equidimensional second-order ODE with variable coefficients. Its second-order version can emerge from Laplace's equation in polar coordinates.
- Euler–Bernoulli beam equation, a fourth-order ODE concerning the elasticity of structural beams.
- Euler's differential equation, a first order nonlinear ordinary differential equation

=== Partial differential equations ===
- Euler conservation equations, a set of quasilinear first-order hyperbolic equations used in fluid dynamics for inviscid flows. In the (Froude) limit of no external field, they are conservation equations.
- Euler–Tricomi equation – a second-order PDE emerging from Euler conservation equations.
- Euler–Poisson–Darboux equation, a second-order PDE playing important role in solving the wave equation.
- Euler–Lagrange equation, a second-order PDE emerging from minimization problems in calculus of variations.
- Euler–Arnold equation, describes the evolution of a velocity field when the Lagrangian flow is a geodesic in a group of smooth transformations.

== Formulas ==
- Euler's formula, e^{ix} = cos x + i sin x
- Euler's polyhedral formula for planar graphs or polyhedra: v − e + f = 2, a special case of the Euler characteristic in topology
- Euler's formula for the critical load of a column: $P_\text{cr}=\frac{\pi^2 EI}{(KL)^2}$
- Euler's continued fraction formula connecting a finite sum of products with a finite continued fraction
- Euler product formula for the Riemann zeta function.
- Euler–Maclaurin formula (Euler's summation formula) relating integrals to sums
- Euler–Rodrigues formula describing the rotation of a vector in three dimensions
- Euler's reflection formula, reflection formula for the gamma function
- Local Euler characteristic formula

== Functions ==
- The Euler function, a modular form that is a prototypical q-series.
- Euler's totient function (or Euler phi (φ) function) in number theory, counting the number of coprime integers less than an integer.
- Euler hypergeometric integral
- Euler–Riemann zeta function

== Identities ==
- Euler's identity e^{iπ} + 1 = 0.
- Euler's four-square identity, which shows that the product of two sums of four squares can itself be expressed as the sum of four squares.
- Euler's identity may also refer to the pentagonal number theorem.

== Numbers ==
- Euler's number, $e=2.71828\dots$, the base of the natural logarithm
- Euler's idoneal numbers, a set of 65 or possibly 66 or 67 integers with special properties
- Euler numbers, integers occurring in the coefficients of the Taylor series of 1/cosh t
- Eulerian numbers count certain types of permutations.
- Euler number (physics), the cavitation number in fluid dynamics.
- Euler number (algebraic topology) – now, Euler characteristic, classically the number of vertices minus edges plus faces of a polyhedron.
- Euler number (3-manifold topology) – see Seifert fiber space
- Lucky numbers of Euler
- Euler's constant gamma $\gamma=0.57721\dots$, also known as the Euler–Mascheroni constant
- Eulerian integers, more commonly called Eisenstein integers, the algebraic integers of form a + bω where ω is a complex cube root of 1.
- Euler–Gompertz constant

== Theorems ==
- Euler's homogeneous function theorem – A homogeneous function is a linear combination of its partial derivatives
- Euler's infinite tetration theorem – About the limit of iterated exponentiation
- Euler's rotation theorem – Movement with a fixed point is rotation
- Euler's theorem (differential geometry) – Orthogonality of the directions of the principal curvatures of a surface
- Euler's theorem in geometry – On distance between centers of a triangle
- Euler's quadrilateral theorem – Relation between the sides of a convex quadrilateral and its diagonals
- Euclid–Euler theorem, characterizing even perfect numbers
- Euler's theorem, on modular exponentiation
- Euler's partition theorem relating the product and series representations of the Euler function Π(1 − x^{n})
- Goldbach–Euler theorem, stating that sum of 1/(k − 1), where k ranges over positive integers of the form m^{n} for m ≥ 2 and n ≥ 2, equals 1
- Gram–Euler theorem

== Laws ==
- Euler's first law, the sum of the external forces acting on a rigid body is equal to the rate of change of linear momentum of the body.
- Euler's second law, the sum of the external moments about a point is equal to the rate of change of angular momentum about that point.

== Other things ==
- 2002 Euler, a minor planet
- Euler (crater), a lunar impact crater
- AMS Euler typeface
- Euler Mathematical Toolbox computer software
- Euler Book Prize, an annual prize for mathematics books
- Euler Lecture, an annual lecture at the University of Potsdam
- Euler Medal, a prize for research in combinatorics
- Leonhard Euler Gold Medal, a prize for outstanding results in mathematics and physics
- Euler (programming language), an Algol derivative
- Euler Society, an American group dedicated to the life and work of Leonhard Euler
- Euler Committee of the Swiss Academy of Sciences, a group dedicated to publishing the Euler's scientific productions
- Euler–Fokker genus, a musical scale
- Project Euler, a collection of programming puzzles
- Leonhard Euler Telescope, a Swiss-operated telescope in Chile
- Rue Euler, a street in Paris, France
- EulerOS, a CentOS Linux based operating system
- French submarine Euler, an early French submarine
- Euler square, a concept in combinatorics
- Euler top, a special case of a rotating rigid body in classical mechanics

== Topics by field of study ==
Selected topics from above, grouped by subject, and additional topics from the fields of music and physical systems

=== Analysis: derivatives, integrals, and logarithms ===
- Euler approximation – (see Euler's method)
- The Euler integrals of the first and second kind, namely the beta function and gamma function.
- The Euler method, a method for finding numerical solutions of differential equations
  - Semi-implicit Euler method
  - Euler–Maruyama method
  - Backward Euler method
- Euler's number e ≈ 2.71828, the base of the natural logarithm, also known as Napier's constant.
- The Euler substitutions for integrals involving a square root.
- Euler's summation formula, a theorem about integrals.
- Cauchy–Euler equation (or Euler equation), a second-order linear differential equation
- Cauchy–Euler operator
- Euler–Maclaurin formula – relation between integrals and sums
- Euler–Mascheroni constant or Euler's constant γ ≈ 0.577216
- Integration using Euler's formula
- Euler summation
- Euler–Boole summation

=== Geometry and spatial arrangement ===
- Euler angles defining a rotation in space
- Euler brick
- Euler's line – relation between triangle centers
- Euler operator – set of functions to create polygon meshes
- Euler filter
- Euler's rotation theorem
- Euler spiral – a curve whose curvature varies linearly with its arc length
- Euler squares, usually called Graeco-Latin squares
- Euler's theorem in geometry, relating the circumcircle and incircle of a triangle
- Euler's quadrilateral theorem, an extension of the parallelogram law to convex quadrilaterals
- Euler–Rodrigues formula concerning Euler–Rodrigues parameters and 3D rotation matrices
- Cramer–Euler paradox
- Euler calculus
- Euler sequence
- Gram–Euler theorem
- Euler measure

=== Graph theory ===
- Euler characteristic (formerly called Euler number) in algebraic topology and topological graph theory, and the corresponding Euler's formula $\chi(S^2)=F-E+V=2$
- Eulerian circuit, Euler cycle or Eulerian path – a path through a graph that takes each edge once
  - Eulerian graph has all its vertices spanned by an Eulerian path
- Euler class
- Euler diagram – popularly called "Venn diagrams", although some use this term only for a subclass of Euler diagrams.
- Euler tour technique

=== Music ===
- Euler–Fokker genus
- Euler's tritone

=== Number theory ===
- Euler's criterion – quadratic residues modulo by primes
- Euler product – infinite product expansion, indexed by prime numbers of a Dirichlet series
- Euler pseudoprime
- Euler–Jacobi pseudoprime
- Euler's totient function (or Euler phi (φ) function) in number theory, counting the number of coprime integers less than an integer.
- Euler system
- Euler's factorization method

=== Physical systems ===
- Euler's Disk – a toy consisting of a circular disk that spins, without slipping, on a surface
- Euler rotation equations, in rigid body dynamics.
- Euler conservation equations in fluid dynamics.
- Euler number (physics), the cavitation number in fluid dynamics.
- Euler's three-body problem
- Euler–Bernoulli beam equation, concerning the elasticity of structural beams.
- Euler formula in calculating the buckling load of columns.
- Euler–Lagrange equation
- Euler–Tricomi equation – concerns transonic flow
- Euler relations – Gives relationship between extensive variables in thermodynamics.
- Eulerian observer – An observer "at rest" in spacetime, i.e. with 4-velocity perpendicular to spatial hypersurfaces.
- Relativistic Euler equations
- Euler top
- Eulerian specification of the flow field
- Euler nutation
- Newton–Euler equations
- d'Alembert–Euler condition
- Euler acceleration or force

=== Polynomials ===
- Euler's homogeneous function theorem, a theorem about homogeneous polynomials.
- Euler polynomials
- Euler spline – splines composed of arcs using Euler polynomials

== See also ==
- Contributions of Leonhard Euler to mathematics
