= Euler operator =

In mathematics Euler operators may refer to:

- Euler–Lagrange differential operators d/dx: see Lagrangian system
- Cauchy–Euler operators e.g. x·d/dx
- quantum white noise conservation or QWN-Euler operator
- Euler operator (digital geometry), a local operation on a mesh which preserves topology
