= Generative model (disambiguation) =

A generative model is a model for generating observable data in probability and statistics.

It may also refer to:

- Simulator model, generative models of Markov decision processes
- Generative artificial intelligence, a subset of artificial intelligence using generative models

== See also ==
Generative Modelling Language
