= John Casey (mathematician) =

Irish geometer

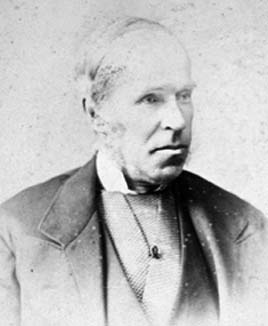
- Born: 12 May 1820; Kilbehenny, County Limerick, Ireland
- Died: 3 January 1891 (aged 70); Dublin
- Education: Trinity College Dublin
- Occupations: geometer, teacher
- Employer(s): University College, Stephen's Green
- Known for: Casey's theorem
- Father: William Casey

John Casey (12 May 1820, Kilbehenny, County Limerick, Ireland – 3 January 1891, Dublin) was a respected Irish geometer. He is most famous for Casey's theorem on a circle that is tangent to four other circles, an extension of Ptolemy's theorem. However, he contributed several novel proofs and perspectives on Euclidean geometry. He and Émile Lemoine are considered to be the co-founders of the modern geometry of the circle and the triangle.

== Biography ==
He was born at Kilbehenny in Limerick, Ireland and educated locally at Mitchelstown, before becoming a teacher under the Board of National Education. He later became headmaster of the Central Model Schools in Kilkenny City. He subsequently entered Trinity College Dublin in 1858, where he was elected a Scholar in 1861 and was awarded the degree of BA in 1862. He was then Mathematics Master at Kingston School (1862–1873), Professor of Higher Mathematics and Mathematical Physics at the newly founded Catholic University of Ireland (1873–1881) and Lecturer in Mathematics at its successor, the University College Dublin (1881–1891).

== Honours and awards ==
In 1869, the University of Dublin awarded Casey the Honorary Degree of Doctor of Laws. He was elected a Fellow of the Royal Society in June 1875. He was elected to the Royal Irish Academy and in 1880 became a member of its council. In 1878 the Academy conferred upon him the much coveted Cunningham Gold Medal. His work was also acknowledged by the Norwegian Government, among others. He was elected a member of the Societe Mathematique de France in 1884 and received the honorary degree of Doctor of Laws from the Royal University of Ireland in 1885.

== Major works ==
- 1880: On Cubic Transformations
- 1881: On Cyclides and Sphero-quartics, from Internet Archive
- 1882: The First Six Books of the Elements of Euclid, link from Project Gutenberg
- 1885: A Treatise on the Analytic Geometry of the Point, Line, Circle and Conic Sections, Second edition, 1893, links from Internet Archive
- 1886 A Sequel to the First Six Books of Euclid, 4th edition, link from Internet Archive
- 1886: A Treatise on Elementary Trigonometry (Dublin, 1886)
- 1888: A Treatise on Plane Trigonometry containing an account of the Hyperbolic Functions
- 1889: A Treatise on Spherical Geometry, link from Internet Archive

== Sources ==
- Irish Monthly (1891), XIX, 106, 152
- Proc. Royal Society (1891), XLIX, 30, p. xxiv.
