= Euler measure =

In measure theory, the Euler measure of a polyhedral set equals the Euler integral of its indicator function.

== The magnitude of an Euler measure ==
By induction, it is easy to show that independent of dimension, the Euler measure (sometimes called an "Euler Characteristic") of a closed bounded convex polyhedron always equals 1, while the Euler measure of a d-D relative-open bounded convex polyhedron is $(-1)^d$.

== See also ==
- Measure theory
