= Euler–Poisson–Darboux equation =

Partial differential equation

In mathematics, the Euler–Poisson–Darboux (EPD) equation is the partial differential equation

$$u_{x,y}+\frac{N(u_x+u_y)}{x+y}=0.$$

This equation is named for Siméon Poisson, Leonhard Euler, and Gaston Darboux. It plays an important role in solving the classical wave equation.

This equation is related to

$$u_{rr}+\frac{m}{r}u_r-u_{tt}=0,$$

by $x=r+t$, $y=r-t$, where $N=\frac{m}{2}$ and some sources quote this equation when referring to the Euler–Poisson–Darboux equation.

The EPD equation is the simplest linear hyperbolic equation in two independent variables whose coefficients exhibit singularities, therefore it has an interest as a paradigm to relativity theory.

Compact support self-similar solution of the EPD equation for thermal conduction was derived starting from the modified Fourier-Cattaneo law.

It is also possible to solve the non-linear EPD equations with the method of generalized separation of variables.

== See also ==
- List of topics named after Leonhard Euler
