= Kilbehenny =

Village in County Limerick, Ireland

Kilbehenny Coill Bheithne
- Village
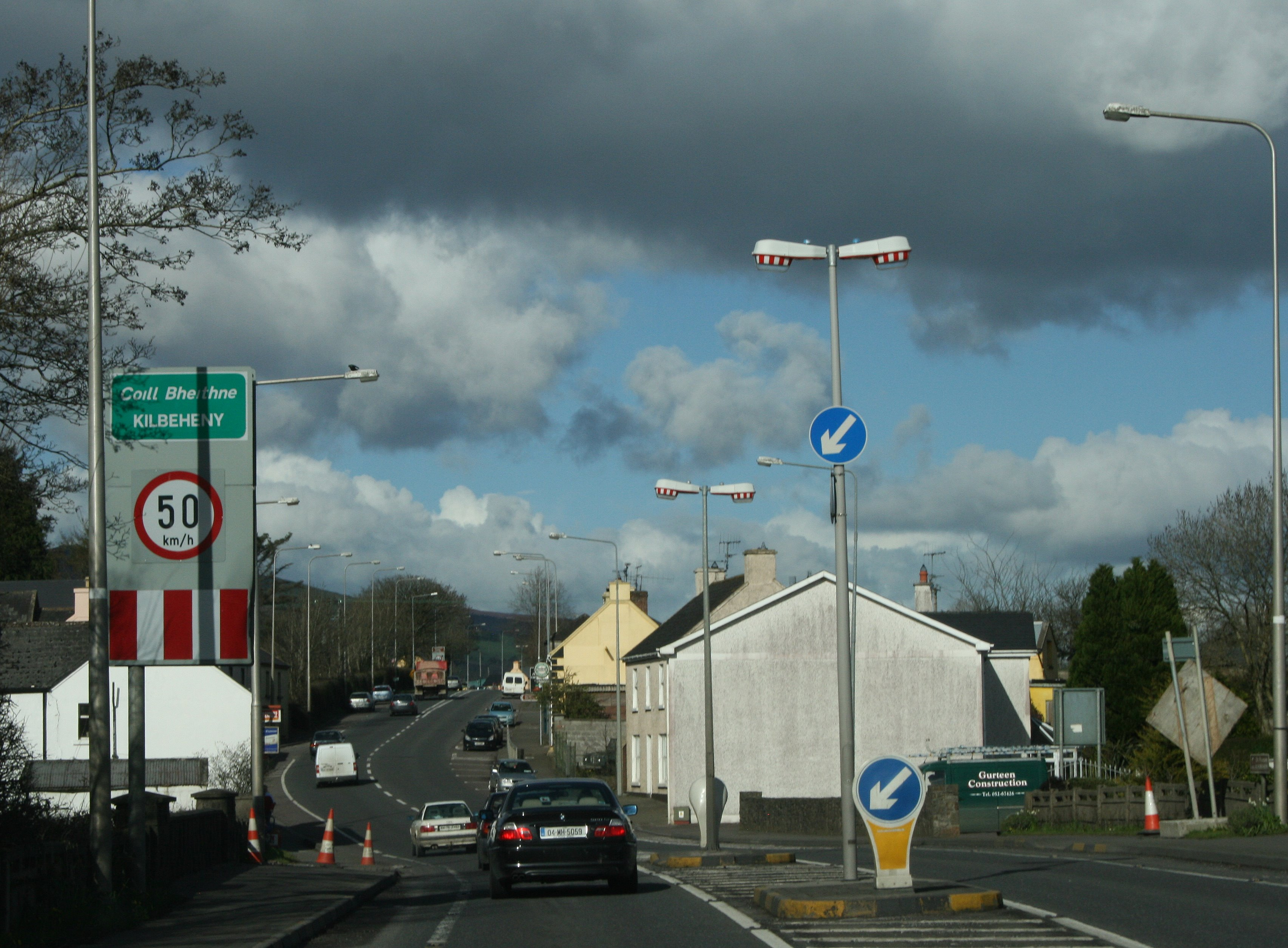
- The R639 road passes through Kilbehenny

- Location within Ireland
- Coordinates: 52°17′41″N 8°12′17″W
- Country: Ireland
- County: County Limerick

Kilbehenny (Irish: Coill Bheithne), also Kilbeheny, is a village in County Limerick, Ireland, on the R639 regional road. It is situated on the County Cork border and is within 2 kilometres (1.2 mi) of the County Tipperary border. The village is 5 km (3 mi) east of Mitchelstown, the nearest town, and 1 km (0.6 mi) from Junction 12 of the M8 Dublin to Cork motorway. Kilbehenny is home to a medieval cemetery, Kilbehenny Graveyard. The River Funshion flows through the village. Kilbeheny is in a civil parish of the same name.

== Notable people ==
- John Casey (1820-1891), mathematician
- Aoibheann Clancy (b.2003), international soccer player
- John O'Mahony (1815–1877), Irish nationalist politician and Gaelic scholar

== See also ==
- List of towns and villages in Ireland
