= Ptolemy's inequality =

Relation between distances of four points

Four points and their six distances. The points are not co-circular, so Ptolemy's inequality is strict for these points.

In Euclidean geometry, Ptolemy's inequality relates the six distances determined by four points in the plane or in a higher-dimensional space. It states that, for any four points A, B, C, and D, the following inequality holds:

$$\overline{AB}\cdot \overline{CD}+\overline{BC}\cdot \overline{DA} \ge \overline{AC}\cdot \overline{BD}.$$

It is named after the Greek astronomer and mathematician Ptolemy.

The four points can be ordered in any of three distinct ways (counting reversals as not distinct) to form three different quadrilaterals, for each of which the sum of the products of opposite sides is at least as large as the product of the diagonals. Thus, the three product terms in the inequality can be additively permuted to put any one of them on the right side of the inequality, so the three products of opposite sides or of diagonals of any one of the quadrilaterals must obey the triangle inequality.

As a special case, Ptolemy's theorem states that the inequality becomes an equality when the four points lie in cyclic order on a circle. The other case of equality occurs when the four points are collinear in order. The inequality does not generalize from Euclidean spaces to arbitrary metric spaces. The spaces where it remains valid are called the Ptolemaic spaces; they include the inner product spaces, Hadamard spaces, and shortest path distances on Ptolemaic graphs.

== Assumptions and derivation ==
Ptolemy's inequality is often stated for a special case, in which the four points are the vertices of a convex quadrilateral, given in cyclic order. However, the theorem applies more generally to any four points; it is not required that the quadrilateral they form be convex, simple, or even planar.

For points in the plane, Ptolemy's inequality can be derived from the triangle inequality by an inversion centered at one of the four points. Alternatively, it can be derived by interpreting the four points as complex numbers, using the complex number identity:

$$(A-B)(C-D)+(A-D)(B-C)=(A-C)(B-D)$$

to construct a triangle whose side lengths are the products of sides of the given quadrilateral, and applying the triangle inequality to this triangle. One can also view the points as belonging to the complex projective line, express the inequality in the form that the absolute values of two cross-ratios of the points sum to at least one, and deduce this from the fact that the cross-ratios themselves add to exactly one.

A proof of the inequality for points in three-dimensional space can be reduced to the planar case, by observing that for any non-planar quadrilateral, it is possible to rotate one of the points around the diagonal until the quadrilateral becomes planar, increasing the other diagonal's length and keeping the other five distances constant. In spaces of higher dimension than three, any four points lie in a three-dimensional subspace, and the same three-dimensional proof can be used.

== Four concyclic points ==
For four points in order around a circle, Ptolemy's inequality becomes an equality, known as Ptolemy's theorem:

$$\overline{AB}\cdot \overline{CD}+\overline{AD}\cdot\overline{BC} = \overline{AC}\cdot \overline{BD}.$$

In the inversion-based proof of Ptolemy's inequality, transforming four co-circular points by an inversion centered at one of them causes the other three to become collinear, so the triangle equality for these three points (from which Ptolemy's inequality may be derived) also becomes an equality. For any other four points, Ptolemy's inequality is strict.

== In three dimensions ==
Four non-coplanar points A, B, C, and D in 3D form a tetrahedron. In this case, the strict inequality holds: $\overline{AB}\cdot \overline{CD}+\overline{BC}\cdot \overline{DA} > \overline{AC}\cdot \overline{BD}$.

== In general metric spaces ==
A cycle graph in which the distances disobey Ptolemy's inequality

Ptolemy's inequality holds more generally in any inner product space, and whenever it is true for a real normed vector space, that space must be an inner product space.

For other types of metric space, the inequality may or may not be valid. A space in which it holds is called Ptolemaic. For instance, consider the four-vertex cycle graph, shown in the figure, with all edge lengths equal to 1. The sum of the products of opposite sides is 2. However, diagonally opposite vertices are at distance 2 from each other, so the product of the diagonals is 4, bigger than the sum of products of sides. Therefore, the shortest path distances in this graph are not Ptolemaic. The graphs in which the distances obey Ptolemy's inequality are called the Ptolemaic graphs and have a restricted structure compared to arbitrary graphs; in particular, they disallow induced cycles of length greater than three, such as the one shown.

The Ptolemaic spaces include all CAT(0) spaces and in particular all Hadamard spaces. If a complete Riemannian manifold is Ptolemaic, it is necessarily a Hadamard space.

== Inner product spaces ==
Suppose that $\|\cdot\|$ is a norm on a vector space $X.$ Then this norm satisfies Ptolemy's inequality:
$$\|x - y\| \, \|z\| ~+~ \|y - z\| \, \|x\| ~\geq~ \|x - z\| \, \|y\| \qquad \text{ for all vectors } x, y, z.$$
if and only if there exists an inner product $\langle \cdot, \cdot \rangle$ on $X$ such that $\|x\|^2 = \langle x,\ x\rangle$ for all vectors $x \in X.$ Another necessary and sufficient condition for there to exist such an inner product is for the norm to satisfy the parallelogram law:
$$\|x+y\|^2 ~+~ \|x-y\|^2 ~=~ 2\|x\|^2 + 2\|y\|^2 \qquad \text{ for all vectors } x, y.$$
If this is the case then this inner product will be unique and it can be defined in terms of the norm by using the polarization identity.

== See also ==
- Greek mathematics – Mathematics of Ancient Greece and the Mediterranean, 5th BC to 6th AD
- Parallelogram law – Sides and diagonals have equal sums of squares
- Polarization identity – Formula relating the norm and the inner product in an inner product space
- Ptolemy – Greco-Roman astronomer and geographer (c. 100–170)
- Ptolemy's table of chords – 2nd century AD trigonometric table
- Ptolemy's theorem – Relates the 4 sides and 2 diagonals of a quadrilateral with vertices on a common circle
