= Euler integral =

In mathematics, there are two types of Euler integral:

1. The Euler integral of the first kind is the beta function
  $$\mathrm{\Beta}(z_1,z_2) = \int_0^1t^{z_1-1}(1-t)^{z_2-1}\,dt = \frac{\Gamma(z_1)\Gamma(z_2)}{\Gamma(z_1+z_2)}$$
2. The Euler integral of the second kind is the gamma function
  $$\Gamma(z) = \int_0^\infty  t^{z-1}\,\mathrm e^{-t}\,dt$$

For positive integers m and n, the two integrals can be expressed in terms of factorials and binomial coefficients:
$$\Beta(n,m) = \frac{(n-1)!(m-1)!}{(n+m-1)! } = \frac{n+m}{nm \binom{n+m}{n}} = \left( \frac{1}{n} + \frac{1}{m} \right) \frac{1}{\binom{n+m}{n}}$$
$$\Gamma(n) = (n-1)!$$

== See also ==
- Leonhard Euler
- List of topics named after Leonhard Euler

== External links and references ==
- NIST Digital Library of Mathematical Functions dlmf.nist.gov/5.2.1 relation 5.2.1 and dlmf.nist.gov/5.12 relation 5.12.1
