= Euler's quadrilateral theorem =

Relation between the sides of a convex quadrilateral and its diagonals

$a^2+b^2+c^2+d^2=e^2+f^2+4g^2$

Euler's quadrilateral theorem or Euler's law on quadrilaterals, named after Leonhard Euler (1707–1783), describes a relation between the sides of a convex quadrilateral and its diagonals. It is a generalisation of the parallelogram law which in turn can be seen as generalisation of the Pythagorean theorem. Because of the latter the restatement of the Pythagorean theorem in terms of quadrilaterals is occasionally called the Euler–Pythagoras theorem.

== Theorem and special cases ==
For a convex quadrilateral with sides $a, b, c, d$, diagonals $e$ and $f$, and $g$ being the line segment connecting the midpoints of the two diagonals, the following equations holds:

$$a^2+b^2+c^2+d^2=e^2+f^2+4g^2$$

If the quadrilateral is a parallelogram, then the midpoints of the diagonals coincide so that the connecting line segment $g$ has length 0. In addition the parallel sides are of equal length, hence Euler's theorem reduces to

$$2a^2+2b^2=e^2+f^2$$

which is the parallelogram law.

If the quadrilateral is a rectangle, the equation simplifies further since now the two diagonals are of equal length as well:

$$2a^2+2b^2=2e^2$$

Dividing by 2 yields:

$$a^2+b^2=e^2$$

In other words, in the case of a rectangle the relation of the quadrilateral's sides and its diagonals is described by the Pythagorean theorem.

== Alternative formulation and extensions ==
Euler's theorem with parallelogram

Euler originally derived the theorem above as corollary from slightly different theorem that requires the introduction of an additional point, but provides more structural insight.

For a given convex quadrilateral $ABCD$ Euler introduced an additional point $E$ such that $ABED$ forms a parallelogram and then the following equality holds:

$$|AB|^2+|BC|^2+|CD|^2+|AD|^2=|AC|^2+|BD|^2+|CE|^2$$

The distance $|CE|$ between the additional point $E$ and the point $C$ of the quadrilateral not being part of the parallelogram can be thought of measuring how much the quadrilateral deviates from a parallelogram, and $|CE|^2$ is a correction term that needs to be added to the parallelogram law.

$M$ being the midpoint of $AC$ yields $\tfrac{|AC|}{|AM|}=2$. Since $N$ is the midpoint of $BD$ it is also the midpoint of $AE$, as $AE$ and $BD$ are both diagonals of the parallelogram $ABED$. This yields $\tfrac{|AE|}{|AN|}=2$ and hence $\tfrac{|AC|}{|AM|}=\tfrac{|AE|}{|AN|}$. Therefore, it follows from the intercept theorem (and its converse) that $CE$ and $NM$ are parallel and $|CE|^2=(2|NM|)^2=4|NM|^2$, which yields Euler's theorem.

Euler's theorem can be extended to a larger set of quadrilaterals that includes crossed and nonplanar ones. It holds for so called generalized quadrilaterals, which simply consist of four arbitrary points in $\mathbb{R}^n$ connected by edges so that they form a cycle graph.
