= Parallelogram law =

Sides and diagonals have equal sums of squares

The sides of parallelogram ABCD are shown in blue and the diagonals in red. The sum of the areas of the blue squares equal that of the red ones.

In mathematics, the simplest form of the parallelogram law (also called the parallelogram identity) belongs to elementary geometry. It states that the sum of the squares of the lengths of the four sides of a parallelogram equals the sum of the squares of the lengths of the two diagonals. We use these notations for the sides: AB, BC, CD, DA. But since in Euclidean geometry a parallelogram necessarily has opposite sides equal, that is, AB = CD and BC = DA, the law can be stated as
$$2AB^2 + 2BC^2 = AC^2 + BD^2\,$$

If the parallelogram is a rectangle, the two diagonals are of equal lengths AC = BD, so
$$2AB^2 + 2BC^2 = 2AC^2$$
and the statement reduces to the Pythagorean theorem. For the general quadrilateral (with four sides not necessarily equal) Euler's quadrilateral theorem states
$$AB^2 + BC^2 + CD^2+DA^2 = AC^2+BD^2 + 4x^2,$$
where $x$ is the length of the line segment joining the midpoints of the diagonals. It can be seen from the diagram that $x = 0$ for a parallelogram, and so the general formula simplifies to the parallelogram law.

== Proof ==

In the parallelogram on the right, let AD = BC = a, AB = DC = b, $\angle BAD = \alpha.$ By using the law of cosines in triangle $\triangle BAD,$ we get:
$$a^2 + b^2-2ab\cos(\alpha) = BD^2.$$

In a parallelogram, adjacent angles are supplementary, therefore $\angle ADC = 180^{\circ} - \alpha.$ Using the law of cosines in triangle $\triangle ADC,$ produces:
$$a^2 + b^2 - 2ab\cos(180^{\circ}-\alpha) = AC^2.$$

By applying the trigonometric identity $\cos(180^{\circ} - x) = -\cos x$ to the former result proves:
$$a^2 + b^2 + 2ab\cos(\alpha) = AC^2.$$

Now the sum of squares $BD^2 + AC^2$ can be expressed as:
$$BD^2 + AC^2 = a^2 + b^2 -2ab\cos(\alpha) + a^2 + b^2 +2ab\cos(\alpha).$$

Simplifying this expression, it becomes:
$$BD^2 + AC^2 = 2a^2 + 2b^2.$$

== The parallelogram law in inner product spaces ==
Vectors involved in the parallelogram law.

In a normed space, the statement of the parallelogram law is an equation relating norms:
$$2\|x\|^2 + 2\|y\|^2 = \|x+y\|^2 + \|x-y\|^2 \quad \text{ for all } x, y.$$

The parallelogram law is equivalent to the seemingly weaker statement:
$$2\|x\|^2 + 2\|y\|^2 \leq \|x + y\|^2 + \|x - y\|^2 \quad \text{ for all } x, y$$
because the reverse inequality can be obtained from it by substituting $\frac{1}{2}\left( x + y \right)$ for $x,$ and $\frac{1}{2}\left( x - y \right)$ for $y,$ and then simplifying. With the same proof, the parallelogram law is also equivalent to:
$$\|x + y\|^2 + \|x - y\|^2 \leq 2\|x\|^2 + 2\|y\|^2 \quad \text{ for all } x, y.$$

In an inner product space, the norm is determined using the inner product:
$$\|x\|^2 = \langle x, x\rangle.$$

As a consequence of this definition, in an inner product space the parallelogram law is an algebraic identity, readily established using the properties of the inner product:
$$\|x+y\|^2 = \langle x+y, x+y\rangle = \langle x, x\rangle + \langle x, y\rangle + \langle y, x\rangle + \langle y, y\rangle,$$
$$\|x-y\|^2 = \langle x-y, x-y\rangle = \langle x, x\rangle - \langle x, y\rangle - \langle y, x\rangle + \langle y, y\rangle.$$

Adding these two expressions:
$$\|x+y\|^2 + \|x-y\|^2 = 2\langle x, x\rangle + 2\langle y, y\rangle = 2\|x\|^2 + 2\|y\|^2,$$
as required.

If $x$ is orthogonal to $y,$ meaning $\langle x ,\ y \rangle = 0,$ and the above equation for the norm of a sum becomes:
$$\|x+y\|^2 = \langle x, x\rangle + \langle x, y\rangle + \langle y, x\rangle + \langle y, y\rangle = \|x\|^2 + \|y\|^2,$$
which is Pythagoras' theorem.

== Normed vector spaces satisfying the parallelogram law ==
Most real and complex normed vector spaces do not have inner products, but all normed vector spaces have norms (by definition). For example, a commonly used norm for a vector $x = (x_1, x_2, \ldots, x_n)$ in the real coordinate space $\R^n$ is the $p$-norm:
$$\|x\| _p = \left(|x_1|^p + |x_2|^p + \dotsb + |x_n|^p\right)^{1/p}.$$

Given a norm, one can evaluate both sides of the parallelogram law above. A remarkable fact is that if the parallelogram law holds, then the norm must arise in the usual way from some inner product. In particular, it holds for the $p$-norm if and only if $p = 2,$ the so-called Euclidean norm or standard norm.

For any norm satisfying the parallelogram law (which necessarily is an inner product norm), the inner product generating the norm is unique as a consequence of the polarization identity. In the real case, the polarization identity is given by any of the expressions:
$$\begin{align}
\langle x, y \rangle
&= \tfrac14\bigl(\|x+y\|^2 - \|x-y\|^2\bigr) \\[5mu]
&= \tfrac12\bigl(\|x+y\|^2 - \|x\|^2 - \|y\|^2\bigr) \\[5mu]
&= \tfrac12\bigl(\|x\|^2 + \|y\|^2 - \|x-y\|^2\bigr).
\end{align}$$

In the complex case it is given by:
$$\langle x, y \rangle = \tfrac14\bigl(\|x+y\|^2 - \|x-y\|^2\bigr) + \tfrac14i\bigl(\|ix+y\|^2 - \|ix-y\|^2\bigr).$$

For example, using the $p$-norm with $p = 2$ and real vectors $x$ and $y,$ the evaluation of the inner product proceeds as follows:
$$\begin{align}
\langle x, y \rangle &= \tfrac14\bigl(\|x+y\|^2 - \|x-y\|^2\bigr)\\[8mu]
&= \tfrac{1}{4} \Bigl(\sum_i |x_i +y_i|^2 - \sum_i |x_i-y_i|^2\Bigr)\\[2mu]
&= \tfrac{1}{4} \Bigl(4 \sum_i x_i y_i\Bigr)\\
&= x \cdot y,\\
\end{align}$$
which is the standard dot product of two vectors.

Another necessary and sufficient condition for there to exist an inner product that induces the given norm $\|\cdot\|$ is for the norm to satisfy Ptolemy's inequality: For any three vectors $x$, $y$, and $z$,
$$\|x - y\| \, \|z\| ~+~ \|y - z\| \, \|x\| ~\geq~ \|x - z\| \, \|y\|.$$

== See also ==
- François Daviet – Royal Sardinian Army officer and mathematician (1734–1798)
- Inner product space – Vector space with generalized dot product
- Minkowski distance – Vector distance using pth powers
- Normed vector space – Vector space on which a distance is defined
- Polarization identity – Formula relating the norm and the inner product in an inner product space
- Ptolemy's inequality – Relation between distances of four points
