= Ptolemy's theorem =

Relates the 4 sides and 2 diagonals of a quadrilateral with vertices on a common circle

Ptolemy's theorem is a relation among these lengths in a cyclic quadrilateral.$\definecolor{V}{RGB}{148,0,211} \definecolor{B}{RGB}{0,0,255} \definecolor{R}{RGB}{204,0,0} {\color{V}AC}\cdot{\color{V}BD}={\color{B}AB}\cdot{\color{B}CD}+{\color{R}BC}\cdot{\color{R}AD}$

In Euclidean geometry, Ptolemy's theorem is a relation between the four sides and two diagonals of a cyclic quadrilateral (a quadrilateral whose vertices lie on a common circle). The theorem is named after the Greek astronomer and mathematician Ptolemy (Claudius Ptolemaeus). Ptolemy used the theorem as an aid to creating his table of chords, a trigonometric table that he applied to astronomy.

If the vertices of the cyclic quadrilateral are A, B, C, and D in order, then the theorem states that:

$$AC\cdot BD = AB\cdot CD+BC\cdot AD$$

This relation may be verbally expressed as follows:

If a quadrilateral is cyclic then the product of the lengths of its diagonals is equal to the sum of the products of the lengths of the pairs of opposite sides.

Moreover, the converse of Ptolemy's theorem is also true:

In a quadrilateral, if the sum of the products of the lengths of its two pairs of opposite sides is equal to the product of the lengths of its diagonals, then the quadrilateral can be inscribed in a circle i.e. it is a cyclic quadrilateral.

To appreciate the utility and general significance of Ptolemy’s Theorem, it is especially useful to study its main corollaries.

== Corollaries on inscribed polygons ==
=== Equilateral triangle ===
Equilateral triangle

Ptolemy's Theorem yields as a corollary a theorem regarding an equilateral triangle inscribed in a circle.

Given An equilateral triangle inscribed on a circle, and a point on the circle.

The distance from the point to the most distant vertex of the triangle is the sum of the distances from the point to the two nearer vertices.

Proof: Follows immediately from Ptolemy's theorem:

$$qs=ps+rs \Rightarrow q=p+r.$$

This corollary has as an application an algorithm for computing minimal Steiner trees whose topology is fixed, by repeatedly replacing pairs of leaves of the tree A, B that should be connected to a Steiner point, by the third point C of their equilateral triangle. The unknown Steiner point must lie on arc AB of the circle, and this replacement ensures that, no matter where it is placed, the length of the tree remains unchanged.

=== Square ===
Any square can be inscribed in a circle whose center is the center of the square. If the common length of its four sides is equal to $a$ then the length of the diagonal (the diameter of the circle) is equal to $a\sqrt{2}$ according to the Pythagorean theorem. Ptolemy's relation holds: $\bigl(\sqrt2\,a\bigr)^2 = a^2 + a^2$.

=== Rectangle ===
Pythagoras's theorem: "manifestum est": Copernicus

More generally, if the quadrilateral is a rectangle with sides a and b and diagonal d then Ptolemy's theorem reduces to the Pythagorean theorem. In this case the center of the circle coincides with the point of intersection of the diagonals. The product of the diagonals is then d^{2}; the right hand side of Ptolemy's relation is the sum a^{2} + b^{2}.

Copernicus – who used Ptolemy's theorem extensively in his trigonometrical work – refers to this result as a 'Porism' or self-evident corollary:

Furthermore it is clear (manifestum est) that when the chord subtending an arc has been given, that chord too can be found which subtends the rest of the semicircle.

=== Pentagon ===
The golden ratio follows from this application of Ptolemy's theorem

A more interesting example is the relation between the length a of the side and the length b of the diagonal in a regular pentagon. By Ptolemy's theorem,
$$b \cdot b = a \cdot a + a \cdot b.$$
By dividing by $a^2$ this can be rewritten as a quadratic equation in terms of $b/a$:
$$\left(\frac{b}{a}\right)^2 = 1 + \frac{b}{a}.$$
This quadratic equation has two solutions,
$$\frac{b}{a} = \frac{1 \pm \sqrt5}{2}$$
The positive solution is the golden ratio: $b/a = \varphi = \tfrac12\bigl(1 + \sqrt5~\!\bigr)$.

=== Side of decagon ===
Side of the inscribed decagon

If now diameter AF is drawn bisecting DC so that DF and CF are sides c of an inscribed decagon, Ptolemy's Theorem can again be applied – this time to cyclic quadrilateral ADFC with diameter d as one of its diagonals:

$$ad=2bc$$

$\Rightarrow ad=2\varphi ac$ where $\varphi$ is the golden ratio.
$\Rightarrow c=\frac{d}{2\varphi}.$

whence the side of the inscribed decagon is obtained in terms of the circle diameter. Pythagoras's theorem applied to right triangle AFD then yields "b" in terms of the diameter and "a" the side of the pentagon is thereafter calculated as

$$a = \frac {b} {\varphi} = b \left( \varphi - 1 \right).$$

As Copernicus (following Ptolemy) wrote,

"The diameter of a circle being given, the sides of the triangle, tetragon, pentagon, hexagon and decagon, which the same circle circumscribes, are also given."

== Proofs ==
=== Visual proof ===
Animated visual proof of Ptolemy's theorem, based on Derrick & Herstein (2012).

The animation here shows a visual demonstration of Ptolemy's theorem, based on Derrick & Herstein (2012).

=== Proof by similarity of triangles ===
Constructions for a proof of Ptolemy's theorem

Let ABCD be a cyclic quadrilateral. On the chord BC, the inscribed angles ∠BAC = ∠BDC, and on AB, ∠ADB = ∠ACB. Construct K on AC such that ∠ABK = ∠CBD; since ∠ABK + ∠CBK = ∠ABC = ∠CBD + ∠ABD, ∠CBK = ∠ABD.

Now, by common angles, △ABK is similar to △DBC, and likewise △ABD is similar to △KBC. Thus AK/AB = CD/BD, and CK/BC = DA/BD; equivalently, AK⋅BD = AB⋅CD, and CK⋅BD = BC⋅DA. By adding two equalities, we have AK⋅BD + CK⋅BD = AB⋅CD + BC⋅DA, and factorizing this gives (AK+CK)·BD = AB⋅CD + BC⋅DA. But AK+CK = AC, so AC⋅BD = AB⋅CD + BC⋅DA, Q.E.D.

The proof as written is only valid for simple cyclic quadrilaterals. If the quadrilateral is self-crossing, then K will be located outside the line segment AC. But in this case, AK−CK = ±AC, giving the expected result.

=== Proof by the Simson line ===
We first use the Theorem stating that for distances $AD, BD, CD$ from a fixed point $D$ to the vertices of $\triangle ABC$, and perpendiculars $DA_1, DB_1, DC_1$ dropped to the three sides $BC, AC, AB$, where the feet of these perpendiculars are the vertices of a triangle $A_1B_1C_1$, the sides of $\triangle A_1B_1C_1$ are

$$B_1C_1=\frac{BC\cdot AD}{2R},\ C_1A_1=\frac{AC\cdot BD}{2R},\ A_1B_1=\frac{AB\cdot CD}{2R},\qquad(1)$$

where $R$ is the radius of the triangle $ABC$ circumcircle. To prove this, we apply the Law of Sines to the triangles $AC_1B_1$, $BA_1C_1$, $CB_1A_1$, and also to $\triangle ABC$ itself.

In the sequel, we place the point $D$ on the circumcircle to obtain the cyclic quadrilateral $ABCD$. Now, the feet $A_1, B_1, C_1$ are colinear, and form the Simsone line. Thus, $A_1C_1=A_1B_1+B_1C_1$, and using (1) yields Ptolemy's theorem.

=== Proof by trigonometric identities ===
Let the inscribed angles subtended by $AB$, $BC$ and $CD$ be, respectively, $\alpha$, $\beta$ and $\gamma$, and the radius of the circle be $R$, then we have $AB=2R\sin\alpha$, $BC=2R\sin\beta$, $CD=2R\sin\gamma$, $AD=2R\sin(180^\circ-(\alpha+\beta+\gamma))$, $AC=2R\sin(\alpha+\beta)$ and $BD=2R\sin(\beta+\gamma)$, and the original equality to be proved is transformed to

$$\sin(\alpha+\beta)\sin(\beta+\gamma) = \sin\alpha\sin\gamma + \sin\beta \sin(\alpha + \beta+\gamma)$$

from which the factor $4R^2$ has disappeared by dividing both sides of the equation by it.

Now by using the angle sum formulae, $\sin(x+y)=\sin{x}\cos y+\cos x\sin y$ and $\cos(x+y)=\cos x\cos y-\sin x\sin y$, it is trivial to show that both sides of the above equation are equal to

$$\begin{align}
& \sin\alpha\sin\beta\cos\beta\cos\gamma + \sin\alpha\cos^2\beta\sin\gamma \\ + {} & \cos\alpha\sin^2\beta\cos\gamma+\cos\alpha\sin\beta\cos\beta\sin\gamma.
\end{align}$$

Q.E.D.

Here is another, perhaps more transparent, proof using rudimentary trigonometry. Define a new quadrilateral $ABCD'$ inscribed in the same circle, where $A, B, C$ are the same as in $ABCD$, and $D'$ located at a new point on the same circle, defined by $|\overline{AD'}| = |\overline{CD}|$, $|\overline{CD'}| = |\overline{AD}|$. (Picture triangle $ACD$ flipped, so that vertex $C$ moves to vertex $A$ and vertex $A$ moves to vertex $C$. Vertex $D$ will now be located at a new point D’ on the circle.) Then, $ABCD'$ has the same lengths of edges, and consequently the same inscribed angles subtended by the corresponding edges, as $ABCD$, only in a different order. That is, $\alpha$, $\beta$ and $\gamma$, for, respectively, $AB, BC$ and $AD'$. Also, $ABCD$ and $ABCD'$ have the same area. Then,

$$\begin{align}
\mathrm{Area}(ABCD) & = \frac{1}{2}  AC\cdot BD \cdot \sin(\alpha + \gamma); \\
\mathrm{Area}(ABCD') & = \frac{1}{2} AB\cdot AD'\cdot \sin(180^\circ - \alpha - \gamma) +
\frac{1}{2} BC\cdot CD' \cdot \sin(\alpha + \gamma)\\ & =
\frac{1}{2} (AB\cdot CD +  BC\cdot AD)\cdot \sin(\alpha + \gamma).
\end{align}$$

Q.E.D.

=== Proof by inversion ===
Proof of Ptolemy's theorem via circle inversion

Choose an auxiliary circle $\Gamma$ of radius $r$ centered at D with respect to which the circumcircle of ABCD is inverted into a line (see figure). Then $A'B' + B'C' = A'C'.$ Then $A'B', B'C'$ and $A'C'$ can be expressed as $\frac{AB \cdot DB'}{DA}$, $\frac{BC \cdot DB'}{DC}$ and $\frac{AC \cdot DC'}{DA}$ respectively. Multiplying each term by $\frac{DA \cdot DC}{DB'}$ and using $\frac{DC'}{DB'} = \frac{DB}{DC}$ yields Ptolemy's equality.

Q.E.D.

Note that if the quadrilateral is not cyclic then A', B' and C' form a triangle and hence A'B'+B'C' > A'C', giving us a very simple proof of Ptolemy's Inequality which is presented below.

=== Proof using complex numbers ===
Embed ABCD in the complex plane $\mathbb{C}$ by identifying $A\mapsto z_A,\ldots,D\mapsto z_D$ as four distinct complex numbers $z_A,\ldots,z_D\in\mathbb{C}$. Define the cross-ratio

$$\zeta:=\frac{(z_A-z_B)(z_C-z_D)}{(z_A-z_D)(z_B-z_C)}\in\mathbb{C}_{\neq0}$$.

Then

$$\begin{align}
\overline{AB}\cdot\overline{CD}+\overline{AD}\cdot\overline{BC}
& = \left|z_A-z_B\right|\left|z_C-z_D\right| + \left|z_A-z_D\right|\left|z_B-z_C\right| \\
& = \left|(z_A-z_B)(z_C-z_D)\right| + \left|(z_A-z_D)(z_B-z_C)\right| \\
& = \left(\left|\frac{(z_A-z_B)(z_C-z_D)}{(z_A-z_D)(z_B-z_C)}\right| + 1\right) \left|(z_A-z_D)(z_B-z_C)\right| \\
& = \left(\left|\zeta\right| +1\right) \left|(z_A-z_D)(z_B-z_C)\right| \\
& \geq  \left|(\zeta +1)(z_A-z_D)(z_B-z_C)\right| \\
& = \left|(z_A-z_B)(z_C-z_D)+(z_A-z_D)(z_B-z_C)\right| \\
& = \left|(z_A-z_C)(z_B-z_D)\right| \\
& = \left|z_A-z_C\right|\left|z_B-z_D\right| \\
& = \overline{AC}\cdot\overline{BD}
\end{align}$$

with equality if and only if the cross-ratio $\zeta$ is a positive real number. This proves Ptolemy's inequality generally, as it remains only to show that $z_A,\ldots,z_D$ lie consecutively arranged on a circle (possibly of infinite radius, i.e. a line) in $\mathbb{C}$ if and only if $\zeta\in\mathbb{R}_{>0}$.

From the polar form of a complex number $z=\vert z\vert e^{i\arg(z)}$, it follows

$$\begin{align}
\arg(\zeta) & = \arg\frac{(z_A-z_B)(z_C-z_D)}{(z_A-z_D)(z_B-z_C)} \\
& = \arg(z_A-z_B)+\arg(z_C-z_D)-\arg(z_A-z_D)-\arg(z_B-z_C) \pmod{2\pi} \\
& = \arg(z_A-z_B)+\arg(z_C-z_D)-\arg(z_A-z_D)-\arg(z_C-z_B) - \arg(-1) \pmod{2\pi} \\
& = - \left[\arg(z_C-z_B)-\arg(z_A-z_B)\right] - \left[\arg(z_A-z_D)-\arg(z_C-z_D)\right] -\arg(-1) \pmod{2\pi} \\
& = - \angle ABC - \angle CDA -\pi \pmod{2\pi}\\
& = 0
\end{align}$$

with the last equality holding if and only if ABCD is cyclic, since a quadrilateral is cyclic if and only if opposite angles sum to $\pi$.

Q.E.D.

Note that this proof is equivalently made by observing that the cyclicity of ABCD, i.e. the supplementarity $\angle ABC$ and $\angle CDA$, is equivalent to the condition

$$\arg\left[(z_A-z_B)(z_C-z_D)\right] = \arg\left[(z_A-z_D)(z_B-z_C)\right] = \arg\left[(z_A-z_C)(z_B-z_D)\right]  \pmod{2\pi}$$;

in particular there is a rotation of $\mathbb{C}$ in which this $\arg$ is 0 (i.e. all three products are positive real numbers), and by which Ptolemy's theorem

$$\overline{AB}\cdot \overline{CD}+\overline{AD}\cdot\overline{BC} = \overline{AC}\cdot \overline{BD}$$

is then directly established from the simple algebraic identity

$$(z_A-z_B)(z_C-z_D)+(z_A-z_D)(z_B-z_C)=(z_A-z_C)(z_B-z_D).$$

== Corollaries ==
$|S_1|=\sin(\theta_1)$

Corollary 1: Pythagoras's theorem

In the case of a circle of unit diameter the sides $S_1,S_2,S_3,S_4$ of any cyclic quadrilateral ABCD are numerically equal to the sines of the angles $\theta_1,\theta_2,\theta_3$ and $\theta_4$ which they subtend (see Law of sines). Similarly the diagonals are equal to the sine of the sum of whichever pair of angles they subtend. We may then write Ptolemy's Theorem in the following trigonometric form:

$$\sin\theta_1\sin\theta_3+\sin\theta_2\sin\theta_4=\sin(\theta_1+\theta_2)\sin(\theta_1+\theta_4)$$

Applying certain conditions to the subtended angles $\theta_1,\theta_2,\theta_3$ and $\theta_4$ it is possible to derive a number of important corollaries using the above as our starting point. In what follows it is important to bear in mind that the sum of angles $\theta_1+\theta_2+\theta_3+\theta_4=180^\circ$.

=== Corollary 1. Pythagoras's theorem ===
Let $\theta_1=\theta_3$ and $\theta_2=\theta_4$. Then $\theta_1+\theta_2=\theta_3+\theta_4=9 0^\circ$ (since opposite angles of a cyclic quadrilateral are supplementary). Then:

$$\sin\theta_1\sin\theta_3+\sin\theta_2\sin\theta_4=\sin(\theta_1+\theta_2)\sin(\theta_1+\theta_4)$$

$$\sin^2\theta_1+\sin^2\theta_2=\sin^2(\theta_1+\theta_2)$$

$$\sin^2\theta_1+\cos^2\theta_1=1$$

=== Corollary 2. The law of cosines ===
Corollary 2: the law of cosines

Let $\theta_2=\theta_4$. The rectangle of corollary 1 is now a symmetrical trapezium with equal diagonals and a pair of equal sides. The parallel sides differ in length by $2x$ units where:

$$x=S_2\cos(\theta_2+\theta_3)$$

It will be easier in this case to revert to the standard statement of Ptolemy's theorem:

$$\begin{array}{lcl}
S_1 S_3 + S_2 S_4={\overline{AC}}\cdot{\overline{BD}}\\
\Rightarrow S_1 S_3+{S_2}^2={\overline{AC}}^2\\
\Rightarrow S_1[S_1-2S_2\cos(\theta_2+\theta_3)]+{S_2}^2={\overline{AC}}^2\\
\Rightarrow {S_1}^2+{S_2}^2-2S_1 S_2\cos(\theta_2+\theta_3)={\overline{AC}}^2\\
\end{array}$$

The cosine rule for triangle ABC.

=== Corollary 3. Compound angle sine (+) ===
Let

$$\theta_1+\theta_2=\theta_3+\theta_4=90^\circ.$$

Then

$$\sin\theta_1\sin\theta_3+\sin\theta_2\sin\theta_4=\sin(\theta_3+\theta_2)\sin(\theta_3+\theta_4)$$

Therefore,

$$\cos\theta_2\sin\theta_3+\sin\theta_2\cos\theta_3=\sin(\theta_3+\theta_2)\times 1$$

Formula for compound angle sine (+).

=== Corollary 4. Compound angle sine (−) ===
Let $\theta_1=90^\circ$. Then $\theta_2+(\theta_3+\theta_4)=90^\circ$. Hence,

$$\sin\theta_1\sin\theta_3+\sin\theta_2\sin\theta_4=\sin(\theta_3+\theta_2)\sin(\theta_3+\theta_4)$$

$$\sin\theta_3+\sin\theta_2\cos(\theta_2+\theta_3)=\sin(\theta_3+\theta_2)\cos\theta_2$$

$$\sin\theta_3=\sin(\theta_3+\theta_2)\cos\theta_2-\cos(\theta_2+\theta_3)\sin\theta_2$$

Formula for compound angle sine (−).

This derivation corresponds to the Third Theorem as chronicled by Copernicus following Ptolemy in Almagest. In particular if the sides of a pentagon (subtending 36° at the circumference) and of a hexagon (subtending 30° at the circumference) are given, a chord subtending 6° may be calculated. This was a critical step in the ancient method of calculating tables of chords.

=== Corollary 5. Compound angle cosine (+) ===
This corollary is the core of the Fifth Theorem as chronicled by Copernicus following Ptolemy in Almagest.

Let $\theta_3=90^\circ$. Then $\theta_1+(\theta_2+\theta_4)=90^\circ$. Hence

$$\sin\theta_1\sin\theta_3+\sin\theta_2\sin\theta_4=\sin(\theta_3+\theta_2)\sin(\theta_3+\theta_4)$$

$$\cos(\theta_2+\theta_4)+\sin\theta_2\sin\theta_4=\cos\theta_2\cos\theta_4$$

$$\cos(\theta_2+\theta_4)=\cos\theta_2\cos\theta_4-\sin\theta_2\sin\theta_4$$

Formula for compound angle cosine (+)

Despite lacking the dexterity of our modern trigonometric notation, it should be clear from the above corollaries that in Ptolemy's theorem (or more simply the Second Theorem) the ancient world had at its disposal an extremely flexible and powerful trigonometric tool which enabled the cognoscenti of those times to draw up accurate tables of chords (corresponding to tables of sines) and to use these in their attempts to understand and map the cosmos as they saw it. Since tables of chords were drawn up by Hipparchus three centuries before Ptolemy, we must assume he knew of the 'Second Theorem' and its derivatives. Following the trail of ancient astronomers, history records the star catalogue of Timocharis of Alexandria. If, as seems likely, the compilation of such catalogues required an understanding of the 'Second Theorem', then the true origins of the latter disappear thereafter into the mists of antiquity; but it cannot be unreasonable to presume that the astronomers, architects and construction engineers of ancient Egypt may have had some knowledge of it.

== Ptolemy's inequality ==
This is not a cyclic quadrilateral. The equality never holds here, and is unequal in the direction indicated by Ptolemy's inequality.

The equation in Ptolemy's theorem is never true with non-cyclic quadrilaterals. Ptolemy's inequality is an extension of this fact, and it is a more general form of Ptolemy's theorem. It states that, given a quadrilateral ABCD, then

$$\overline{AB}\cdot \overline{CD}+\overline{BC}\cdot \overline{DA} \ge \overline{AC}\cdot \overline{BD}$$

where equality holds if and only if the quadrilateral is cyclic. This special case is equivalent to Ptolemy's theorem.

== Related theorem about the ratio of the diagonals ==
Ptolemy's theorem gives the product of the diagonals (of a cyclic quadrilateral) knowing the sides. The following theorem yields the same for the ratio of the diagonals.

$$\frac{AC}{BD}=\frac{AB \cdot DA + BC \cdot CD}{AB \cdot BC + DA \cdot CD}$$

Proof: It is known that the area of a triangle $ABC$ inscribed in a circle of radius $R$ is: $\mathcal {A} = \frac{AB \cdot BC \cdot CA}{4R}$

Writing the area of the quadrilateral as sum of two triangles sharing the same circumscribing circle, we obtain two relations for each decomposition.

$$\mathcal {A}_\text{tot} = \frac{AB \cdot BC \cdot CA }{4R} + \frac {CD \cdot DA \cdot AC}{4R} = \frac {AC \cdot (AB \cdot BC + CD \cdot DA)}{4R}$$

$$\mathcal {A}_\text{tot} = \frac{AB \cdot BD \cdot DA}{4R} + \frac {BC \cdot CD \cdot DB}{4R} = \frac {BD \cdot (AB \cdot DA + BC \cdot CD)}{4R}$$

Equating, we obtain the announced formula.

Consequence: Knowing both the product and the ratio of the diagonals, we deduce their immediate expressions:

$$\begin{align}
AC^2 & =AC \cdot BD \cdot \frac{AC}{BD}=(AB \cdot CD + BC \cdot DA)\frac{AB \cdot DA + BC \cdot CD}{AB \cdot BC + DA \cdot CD} \\[8pt]
BD^2 & =\frac {AC \cdot BD}{\frac{AC}{BD}}=(AB \cdot CD + BC \cdot DA)\frac{AB \cdot BC + DA \cdot CD}{AB \cdot DA + BC \cdot CD}
\end{align}$$

== See also ==
- Casey's theorem
- Intersecting chords theorem
- Greek mathematics
