= Cauchy–Euler operator =

In mathematics, a Cauchy–Euler operator is a differential operator of the form $p(x)\cdot{d \over dx}$ for a polynomial p. It is named after Augustin-Louis Cauchy and Leonhard Euler. The simplest example is that in which p(x) = x, which has eigenvalues n = 0, 1, 2, 3, ... and corresponding eigenfunctions x^{n}.

== See also ==
- Cauchy–Euler equation
- Sturm–Liouville theory
