= List of equations =

This is a list of equations, indicating each Wikipedia page under appropriate bands of their field.

== Eponymous equations ==
The following equations are named after researchers who discovered or worked on them.

=== Mathematics ===
- Abel equation
- Abel equation of the first kind
- Abel equation of the second kind
- Abel–Plana formula
- Abel's binomial theorem
- Abel's identity
- Abel's summation formula
- Airy equation
- Bailey–Borwein–Plouffe formula
- Bellard's formula
- Beltrami equation
- Bernoulli differential equation
- Bessel equation
- Bezout's identity
- Bianchi identities
- Binet's formula
- Böttcher's equation
- Brahmagupta–Fibonacci identity
- Brahmagupta's formula
- Brahmagupta's identity
- Brahmagupta's interpolation formula
- Brahmagupta's problem
- Brocard–Ramanujan Diophantine equation
- Cartan's magic formula
- Cauchy formula for repeated integration
- Cauchy–Riemann equations
- Cauchy's functional equation
- Cauchy's integral formula
- Cauchy–Riemann equations
- Cesàro equation
- Chapman–Kolmogorov equation
- Chebyshev equation
- Chrystal's equation
- Chudnovsky formula
- Clairaut's equation
- Clausen's formula
- D'Alembert's equation
- Darboux differential equation
- Demazure character formula
- De Moivre's formula
- Dirichlet class number formula
- Dirichlet hyperbola method
- Duffing equation
- ELSV formula
- Erdős–Moser equation
- Euler–Maclaurin formula
- Euler product formula
- Euler–Rodrigues formula
- Euler's continued fraction formula
- Euler's differential equation
- Euler's four-square identity
- Euler's identity
- Euler's polyhedral formula
- Euler's reflection formula
- Faà di Bruno's formula
- Faulhaber's formula
- Frullani's integral formula
- Gauss's digamma theorem
- Gauss's summation theorem
- Generalized Stokes theorem
- Green's theorem
- Helmholtz equation
- Heron's formula
- Hill differential equation
- Jacobi equation
- Jacobi identity
- Jacobi–Madden equation
- Jacobi triple product
- Jensen's formula
- Kardar–Parisi–Zhang equation
- Kirillov character formula
- Kummer's theorem
- Laguerre differential equation
- Lanczos approximation
- Laplace's equation
- Legendre's differential equation
- Legendre's formula
- Leibniz formula for determinants
- Leibniz formula for π
- Leibniz integral rule
- Leibniz's rule
- Legendre's equation
- L'Hôpital's rule
- Liénard equation
- Liouville's equation
- Ljunggren's equation
- Loewner differential equation
- Markov equation
- Maurer–Cartan equation
- Mordell equation
- Newton's identities
- Pell's equation
- Perron's formula
- Picard–Fuchs equation
- Poisson's equation
- Poisson summation formula
- Pythagorean theorem
- Rabinovich–Fabrikant equations
- Ramanujan–Nagell equation
- Ramanujan–Sato series
- Ramanujan's identity
- Riccati equation
- Riemann's differential equation
- Riemann's explicit formula
- Riemann–Roch theorem
- Riemann–Siegel formula
- Riemann–von Mangoldt formula
- Rodrigues' formula
- Rodrigues' rotation formula
- Rogers–Ramanujan identities
- Rössler system
- Schröder's equation
- Selberg trace formula
- Sine-Gordon equation
- Sophie Germain's identity
- Stewart's theorem
- Stirling's approximation
- Stokes' theorem
- Sturm–Liouville equation
- Thue equation
- Tzitzeica equation
- Van der Pol equation
- Vandermonde's identity
- Verhulst equation
- Vieta's formulas
- Viète's formula
- Wallis product
- Weierstrass equation
- Weil's explicit formula
- Weyl character formula
- Weyl integration formula
- Whewell equation

=== Physics ===
- AKNS system
- Allen–Cahn equation
- Amagat's law
- Ampère's circuital law
- Antoine equation
- Arden Buck equation
- Appell's equation of motion
- Avogadro's law
- Basquin's law
- Bernoulli's equation
- Bogoliubov–Born–Green–Kirkwood–Yvon hierarchy of equations
- Beer–Lambert law
- Benjamin–Bona–Mahony equation
- Benjamin–Ono equation
- Bessel's differential equation
- Binet equation
- Biot–Savart law
- Birch–Murnaghan equation of state
- Boltzmann equation
- Borda–Carnot equation
- Boyle's law
- Bretherton equation
- Burgers' equation
- Burnett equations
- Cahn–Hilliard equation
- Camassa–Holm equation
- Cauchy's equation
- Cauchy momentum equation
- Chaplygin's equation
- Charles's law
- Clarke's equation
- Clausius–Clapeyron relation
- Coulomb's law
- Coulomb's law for magnetism
- Curie's law
- Curie–Weiss law
- D'Alembert's principle
- Dalton's law of partial pressures
- Darcy's law
- Darcy–Weisbach equation
- Davey–Stewartson equation
- Dirac equation
- Dirac equation in the algebra of physical space
- Dirac–Kähler equation
- Doppler equations
- Drake equation (aka Green Bank equation)
- Duhem–Margules equation
- Ehrenfest theorem
- Einstein field equations
- Euler–Arnold equation
- Euler–Bernoulli equation
- Euler equations (fluid dynamics)
- Euler's equations (rigid body dynamics)
- Euler–Lagrange equation
- Euler–Tricomi equation
- Euler–Lagrange–Herglotz equation
- Faraday's law of induction
- Faxén's law
- Fick's laws of diffusion
- Fokker–Planck equation
- Föppl–von Kármán equations
- Fourier's law
- Fresnel equations
- Friedmann equations
- Gardner equation
- Gauss's law for electricity
- Gauss's law for gravity
- Gauss's law for magnetism
- Gay-Lussac's law
- Gibbs–Duhem equation
- Gibbs–Helmholtz equation
- Gibbs–Thomson equation
- Ginzburg–Landau equation
- Glen–Nye flow law
- Goff–Gratch equation
- Graham's law
- Green's law
- Gross–Pitaevskii equation
- Hagen–Poiseuille equation
- Hamilton–Jacobi equation
- Hamilton–Jacobi–Bellman equation
- Hamilton–Jacobi–Einstein equation
- Hamilton's equation
- Hamilton's principle
- Hellmann–Feynman theorem
- Helmholtz equation
- Hooke's law
- Hopkinson's law
- Hubble's law
- Hunter–Saxton equation
- Hu–Washizu principle
- Ishimori equation
- Jurin's law
- Kadomtsev–Petviashvili equation
- Kardar–Parisi–Zhang equation
- Karplus equation
- Kepler's equation
- Kepler's laws of planetary motion
- Kirchhoff's circuit laws
- Kirchhoff equations
- Kirchhoff's diffraction formula
- Klein–Gordon equation
- Köhler equation
- Korteweg–de Vries equation
- Korteweg–de Vries–Burgers equation
- Korteweg-de Vries-Burgers-Fisher equation
- Kuramoto–Shiavinsky equation
- Lambert's cosine law
- Lami's theorem
- Landau–Lifshitz–Gilbert equation
- Landau–Lifshitz model
- Lane–Emden equation
- Langevin equation
- Larmor formula
- Leonard–Merritt mass estimator
- Levy–Mises equations
- Lindblad equation
- Liouville equation
- Logarithmic Schrödinger equation
- Lorentz equation
- Lorenz system
- Maxwell's equations
- Maxwell relations
- Michelson–Sivashinsky equation
- Mie–Grüneisen equation of state
- Modified Korteweg–De Vries equation
- Murnaghan equation of state
- Newton–Euler equations
- Newton's law of cooling
- Newton's law of universal gravitation
- Newton's laws of motion
- Newton's sine-square law of air resistance
- Nahm equations
- Navier–Stokes equations
- Nonlinear Schrödinger equation
- Novikov–Veselov equation
- Ohm's law
- Ostwald–Freundlich equation
- Pascal's law
- Planck's law
- Prandtl–Reuss equations
- Prony equation
- Rankine–Hugoniot equation
- Redlich–Kwong equation of state
- Relativistic Euler equations
- Reynolds-averaged Navier–Stokes equations
- Reynolds transport theorem
- Roothaan equations
- Rose–Vinet equation of state
- Saha ionization equation
- Sackur–Tetrode equation
- Saha ionization equation
- Samik Hazra equation
- Schrödinger equation
- Screened Poisson equation
- Schwinger–Dyson equation
- Sellmeier equation
- Sérsic profile
- Shrira–Pesenson equation
- Snell's law
- Sommerfeld identity
- Stefan–Boltzmann law
- Stokes–Einstein relation
- Stokes's law
- Tetens equation
- Timoshenko–Ehrenfest equations
- Torricelli's equation
- Torricelli's law
- Tsiolkovsky rocket equation
- Udwadia–Kalaba equations of motion
- Van der Waals equation
- Vlasov equation
- Weyl expansion
- Wheeler–DeWitt equation
- Wien approximation
- Wiener equation
- Wien's displacement law
- Yang–Mills equations
- Young–Laplace equation
- Zakharov–Schulman system

=== Chemistry ===
- Arrhenius equation
- Butler–Volmer equation
- Dalton's law of partial pressures
- Darken's equations
- Eyring equation
- Faraday's law of electrolysis
- Henderson–Hasselbalch equation
- Hess's law
- Kelvin equation
- Lamm equation
- Langmuir adsorption model
- Michaelis–Menten equation
- Mitscherlich's law of isomorphism
- Nernst equation
- Ostwald dilution law
- Raoult's law
- Schrödinger equation
- Steno's law
- Urey–Bigeleisen–Mayer equation
- Van 't Hoff equation

=== Biology ===
- Breeder's equation
- Hardy–Weinberg principle
- Hill equation
- Lotka–Volterra equation
- Michaelis–Menten equation
- Poiseuille equation
- Price equation

=== Other ===
- Amdahl's law
- Archie's law
- Birch's law
- Black–Scholes equation
- Bruun rule
- Byerlee's law
- Fisher equation
- Fitt's law
- Gardner's relation
- Gustafson's law
- Heaps's law
- Zipf's law

== Other equations ==
=== Mathematics ===
- Polynomial equation
  - Linear equation
  - Quadratic equation
  - Cubic equation
  - Biquadratic equation
  - Quartic equation
  - Quintic equation
  - Sextic equation
- Characteristic equation
- Class equation
- Comparametric equation
- Difference equation
  - Matrix difference equation
- Differential equation
  - Matrix differential equation
  - Ordinary differential equation
  - Partial differential equation
  - Total differential equation
- Diophantine equation
- Equation
- Modular equation
- Parametric equation
- Replicator equation

=== Physics ===
- Advection equation
- Barotropic vorticity equation
- Continuity equation
- Diffusion equation
- Drag equation
- Equations of motion
- Equation of state
- Equation of time
- Heat equation
- Ideal gas equation
- Ideal MHD equations
- Mass–energy equivalence equation
- Primitive equations
- Relativistic wave equations
- Vis-viva equation
- Vorticity equation
- Wave equation

=== Chemistry ===
- Chemical equation (aka molecular equation)
- Thermochemical equation

=== Telecommunications engineering ===
- Password length equation
- Telegrapher's equations

- Functional equation
- Functional equation (L-function)

== Lists of equations ==
- Constitutive equation
- Laws of science
- Defining equation (physical chemistry)
- List of equations in classical mechanics
- Table of thermodynamic equations
- List of equations in wave theory
- List of electromagnetism equations
- List of relativistic equations
- List of equations in fluid mechanics
- List of equations in gravitation
- List of photonics equations
- List of equations in quantum mechanics
- List of equations in nuclear and particle physics

== See also ==
- Variables commonly used in physics
- Equation solving
- Theory of equations
