= List of nonlinear ordinary differential equations =

Differential equations are prominent in many scientific areas. Nonlinear ones are of particular interest for their commonality in describing real-world systems and how much more difficult they are to solve compared to linear differential equations. This list presents nonlinear ordinary differential equations that have been named, sorted by area of interest.

== Mathematics ==
Name	Order	Equation	Application	Reference
Abel's differential equation of the first kind	1	$\frac{dy}{dx} = f_o(x) + f_1(x) y + f_2(x) y^2 + f_3(x) y^3$	Class of differential equation which may be solved implicitly	
Abel's differential equation of the second kind	1	$(g_o(x) + g_1(x) y)\frac{dy}{dx} = f_o(x) + f_1(x) y + f_2(x) y^2 + f_3(x) y^3$	Class of differential equation which may be solved implicitly	
Bernoulli equation	1	$\frac{dy}{dx} + P(x) y = Q(x) y^n$	Class of differential equation which may be solved exactly	
Binomial differential equation	$m$	$\left( y' \right)^m = f(x,y)$	Class of differential equation which may sometimes be solved exactly	
Briot-Bouquet Equation	1	$x^m y' = f(x, y)$	Class of differential equation which may sometimes be solved exactly	
Cherwell-Wright differential equation	1	$\frac{dx}{dt} = (a - x(t-1))x(t)$ or the related form $f'(x) = \frac{-f(x)f(\sqrt{x})}{2x}$	An example of a nonlinear delay differential equation; applications in number theory, distribution of primes, and control theory	
Chrystal's equation	1	$\left(\frac{dy}{dx}\right)^2 + Ax \frac{dy}{dx} + By + Cx^2 =0$	Generalization of Clairaut's equation with a singular solution	
Clairaut's equation	1	$y= x\frac{dy}{dx} + f\left(\frac{dy}{dx}\right)$	Particular case of d'Alembert's equation which may be solved exactly	
d'Alembert's equation or Lagrange's equation	1	$y = x f\left(\frac{dy}{dx}\right) + g\left(\frac{dy}{dx}\right)$	May be solved exactly	
Darboux equation	1	$\frac{dy}{dx} = \frac{P(x,y) + y R(x,y)}{Q(x,y) + xR(x,y)}$	A generalization of the Jacobi equation. Can be solved without quadratures, if certain amount of distinct particular solutions are found. In case $P\left(x, y \right)$ and $Q\left(x, y \right)$ are homogenous polynomials of the same degree, this equation is either homogenous itself, or can be reduced to a Bernoulli differential equation.	
Elliptic function	1	$y' = \sqrt{\left(1-y^2\right)\left(1-k^2y^2\right)}$	Equation for which the elliptic functions are solutions	
Euler's differential equation	1	$\frac{dy}{dx} + \frac{\sqrt{a_0+a_1y +a_2 y^2 + a_3 y^3 + a_4 y^4}}{\sqrt{a_0+a_1x +a_2 x^2 + a_3 x^3 + a_4 x^4}} = 0$	A separable differential equation	
Euler's differential equation	1	$y' + y'^2 = \alpha x^m$	A differential equation which may be solved with Bessel functions	
Jacobi equation	1	$\frac{dy}{dx} = \frac{Axy + By^2 + ax + by + c}{Ax^2 + Bxy +\alpha x +\beta y + \gamma}$	Special case of the Darboux equation, integrable in closed form	
Loewner differential equation	1	$\frac{dw}{dt} = -wp_t(w)$	Important in complex analysis and geometric function theory	
Logistic differential equation (sometimes known as the Verhulst model)	2	$\frac{d}{dx}f(x) = f(x)\big(1 - f(x)\big)$	Special case of the Bernoulli differential equation; many applications including in population dynamics	
Lorenz attractor	1	$$\begin{align} \frac{\mathrm{d}x}{\mathrm{d}t} &= \sigma (y - x) \\ \frac{\mathrm{d}y}{\mathrm{d}t} &= x (\rho - z) - y \\ \frac{\mathrm{d}z}{\mathrm{d}t} &= x y - \beta z \end{align}$$	Chaos theory, dynamical systems, meteorology	
Nahm equations	1	$$\begin{align} \frac{dT_1}{dz}&=[T_2,T_3]\\ \frac{dT_2}{dz}&=[T_3,T_1]\\ \frac{dT_3}{dz}&=[T_1,T_2] \end{align}$$	Differential geometry, gauge theory, mathematical physics, magnetic monopoles	
Painlevé I transcendent	2	$\frac{d^2y}{dt^2} = 6 y^2 + t$	One of fifty classes of differential equation of the form $y'' = R(y', y, t)$; the six Painlevé transcendents required new special functions to solve	
Painlevé II transcendent	2	$\frac{d^2y}{dt^2} = 2 y^3 + ty + \alpha$	One of fifty classes of differential equation of the form $y'' = R(y', y, t)$; the six Painlevé transcendents required new special functions to solve	
Painlevé III transcendent	2	$ty\frac{d^2y}{dt^2} = t \left(\frac{dy}{dt} \right)^2-y\frac{dy}{dt} + \delta t + \beta y + \alpha y^3 + \gamma ty^4$	One of fifty classes of differential equation of the form $y'' = R(y', y, t)$; the six Painlevé transcendents required new special functions to solve	
Painlevé IV transcendent	2	$y\frac{d^2y}{dt^2}=\tfrac12 \left(\frac{dy}{dt} \right)^2+\beta+2(t^2-\alpha)y^2+4ty^3+\tfrac32y^4$	One of fifty classes of differential equation of the form $y'' = R(y', y, t)$; the six Painlevé transcendents required new special functions to solve	
Painlevé V transcendent	2	$\frac{d^2y}{dt^2}=\left(\frac{1}{2 y }+\frac{1}{ y -1}\right) \left( \frac{dy}{dt} \right)^2 -\frac{1}{t} \frac{dy}{dt}+\frac{( y -1)^2}{t^2}\left(\alpha y +\frac{\beta}{ y }\right) +\gamma\frac{ y }{t}+\delta\frac{ y ( y +1)}{ y -1}$	One of fifty classes of differential equation of the form $y'' = R(y', y, t)$; the six Painlevé transcendents required new special functions to solve	
Painlevé VI transcendent	2	$$\begin{align} \frac{d^2y}{dt^2}&=\frac{1}{2}\left(\frac{1}{y}+\frac{1}{y-1}+\frac{1}{y-t}\right)\left( \frac{dy}{dt} \right)^2-\left(\frac{1}{t}+\frac{1}{t-1}+\frac{1}{y-t}\right)\frac{dy}{dt}  \\ &+\frac{y(y-1)(y-t)}{t^2(t-1)^2} \left(\alpha+\beta\frac{t}{y^2}+\gamma\frac{t-1}{(y-1)^2}+\delta\frac{t(t-1)}{(y-t)^2}\right)\\ \end{align}$$	All of the other Painlevé transcendents are degenerations of the sixth	
Rabinovich–Fabrikant equations	1	$$\begin{align} \dot{x} &= y (z - 1 + x^2) + \gamma x \\ \dot{y} &= x (3z + 1 - x^2) + \gamma y \\ \dot{z} &= -2z (\alpha + xy) \end{align}$$	Chaos theory, dynamical systems	
Riccati equation	1	$\frac{dy}{dx} + Q(x) y + R(x) y^2 = P(x)$	Class of first order differential equations that is quadratic in the unknown. Can reduce to Bernoulli differential equation or linear differential equation in certain cases	
Rössler attractor	1	$$\begin{align}  \frac{dx}{dt} &= -y - z \\ \frac{dy}{dt} &= x + ay \\ \frac{dz}{dt} &= b + z(x-c) \end{align}$$	Chaos theory, dynamical systems	

== Physics ==
Name	Order	Equation	Applications	Reference
Bellman's equation or Emden-Fowler's equation	2	$\frac{d}{dt}\left(t^\rho \frac{du}{dt}\right) = t^\sigma u^\rho$ (Emden-Fowler) which reduces to $\frac{d^2u}{dx^2} = \phi^2 u^p$ if $\sigma + \rho = 0$ (Bellman)	Diffusion in a slab	
Besant-Rayleigh-Plesset equation	2	$R\frac{d^2R}{dt^2} + \frac{3}{2}\left(\frac{dR}{dt}\right)^2 + \frac{4\nu_L}{R}\frac{dR}{dt} + \frac{2\sigma}{\rho_L R} + \frac{\Delta P(t)}{\rho} = 0$	Spherical bubble in fluid dynamics	
Blasius equation	3	$\frac{d^3y}{dx^3} + y \frac{d^2y}{dx^2} =0$	Blasius boundary layer	
Chandrasekhar's white dwarf equation	2	$\frac{1}{x^2} \frac{d}{dx}\left(x^2 \frac{dy}{dx}\right) + (y^2 - c)^{3/2}=0$	Gravitational potential of white dwarf in astrophysics	
De Boer-Ludford equation	2	$\frac{d^2y}{dx^2} -xy =y |y|^\alpha, \ \alpha>0$	Plasma physics	
Emden–Chandrasekhar equation	2	$\frac{1}{\xi^2} \frac{d}{d\xi}\left(\xi^2 \frac{d\psi}{d\xi}\right)= e^{-\psi}$	Astrophysics	
Ermakov-Pinney equation	2	$\ddot{x} + \omega^2 x = \frac{h^2}{x^3}$	Electromagnetism, oscillation, scalar field cosmologies	
Falkner–Skan equation	3	$\frac{d^3y}{dx^3} + y \frac{d^2y}{dx^2} + \beta \left[1-\left(\frac{dy}{dx}\right)^2\right]=0$	Falkner–Skan boundary layer	
Friedmann equations	2	$\frac{\ddot{a}}{a} = -\frac{4 \pi G}{3}\left(\rho+\frac{3p}{c^2}\right) + \frac{\Lambda c^2}{3}$ and $\frac{\dot{a}^2 + kc^2}{a^2} = \frac{8 \pi G \rho + \Lambda c^2}{3}$	Physical cosmology	
Heisenberg equation of motion	1	$\frac{d\hat{A(t)}}{dt} = \frac{i}{\hbar}[\hat{\mathcal{H}}, \hat{A}]$	Quantum mechanics	
Ivey's equation	2	$\frac{d^2y}{dx^2} - \frac{1}{y} \left(\frac{dy}{dx}\right)^2 + \frac{2}{x}\frac{dy}{dx} + ky^2=0$	Space charge theory	
Kidder equation	2	$\sqrt{1-\alpha y} \frac{d^2y}{dx^2} + 2x \frac{dy}{dx}=0,\ 0\leq\alpha\leq 1$	Flow through porous medium	
Krogdahl equation	2	$\frac{d^2 Q}{d\tau^2} = -Q + \frac{2}{3}\lambda Q^2 + \frac{14}{27} \lambda^2 Q^3 + \mu(1-Q^2)\frac{dQ}{d\tau} + \frac{2}{3}\lambda(1-\lambda Q) \left(\frac{dQ}{d\tau}\right)^2+\cdots$	Stellar pulsation in astrophysics	
Lagerstrom equation	2	$y'' + \frac{k}{r}y' + \epsilon y' y = 0$	One dimensional viscous flow at low Reynolds numbers	
Lane–Emden equation or polytropic differential equation	2	$\frac{1}{\xi^2} \frac{d}{d\xi} \left({\xi^2 \frac{d\theta}{d\xi}}\right) + \theta^n = 0$	Astrophysics	
Liñán's equation	2	$\frac{d^2y}{d\zeta^2} =(y^2-\zeta^2)e^{-\delta^{1/3}(y+\gamma \zeta)}$	Combustion	
Pendulum equation	2	$\frac{d^2\theta}{dt^2}+\frac{g}{\ell} \sin\theta=0$	Mechanics	
Poisson–Boltzmann equation (1d case)	2	$\frac{d^2\theta}{dz^2} + \frac{k}{z}\frac{d\theta}{dz} = -\delta e^\theta$	Inflammability and the theory of thermal explosions	
Stuart–Landau equation	1	$\frac{dA}{dt} = \sigma A - \frac{l}{2}A |A|^2$	Hydrodynamic stability	
Taylor–Maccoll equation	2	$(c^2-f'^2) f'' + c^2 \cot\theta f' + (2c^2-f'^2) f = 0, \quad c = c(f^2+f'^2)$ where $f' = \frac{df}{d\theta}$	Flow behind a conical shock wave	
Thomas–Fermi equation	2	$\frac{d^2y}{dx^2} = \frac{1}{\sqrt x}y^{3/2}$	Quantum mechanics	
Toda lattice	1	$$\begin{align} \dot{a}(n,t) &= a(n,t) \Big(b(n+1,t)-b(n,t)\Big) \\ \dot{b}(n,t) &= 2 \Big(a(n,t)^2-a(n-1,t)^2\Big) \end{align}$$ where $$\begin{align} a(n,t) &= \frac{1}{2} {\rm e}^{-(q(n+1,t) - q(n,t))/2}\\ b(n,t) &= -\frac{1}{2} p(n,t) \end{align}$$	Model of one-dimensional crystal in solid-state physics, Langmuir oscillations in plasma, quantum cohomology; notable for being a completely integrable system	
Trachenko-Zaccone	1	$\frac{dy}{dt} = -\frac{y}{\tau}\exp(K y)$	Condensed matter physics; relaxation in amorphous solids and glass transition	

== Engineering ==
Name	Order	Equation	Applications	Reference
Duffing equation	2	$\frac{d^2x}{dt^2} + \mu \frac{dx}{dt} + \alpha x + \beta x^3 = \gamma \cos \omega t$	Oscillators, hysteresis, chaotic dynamical systems	
Lewis regulator	2	$y'' + (1 - |y|)y' + y = 0$	Oscillators	
Liénard equation	2	${d^2x \over dt^2} + f(x){dx \over dt} + g(x) = 0$ with $f$ odd and $g$ even	Oscillators, electrical engineering, dynamical systems	
Rayleigh equation	2	$y'' + F(y') + y = 0$	Oscillators (especially auto-oscillation), acoustics; the Van der Pol equation is a Rayleigh equation	
Van der Pol equation	2	${d^2x \over dt^2}-\mu(1-x^2){dx \over dt}+x= 0$	Oscillators, electrical engineering, chaotic dynamical systems	

== Chemistry ==
Name	Order	Equation	Applications	Reference
Brusselator	1	$$\begin{align} {d \over dt}\left\{ X \right\} &= \left\{A \right\} + \left\{ X \right\}^2 \left\{Y \right\}  - \left\{B \right\} \left\{X \right\} - \left\{X \right\}\\ {d \over dt}\left\{ Y \right\} &=   \left\{B \right\} \left\{X \right\} - \left\{ X \right\}^2 \left\{Y \right\} \end{align}$$	A type of autocatalytic reaction modelled at constant concentration	
Oregonator	1	$$\begin{align} \frac{d [X]}{dt}&=  k_I [A] [Y] - k_{II} [X] [Y] + k_{III} [A] [X] - 2k_{IV} [X]^2 \\ \frac{d [Y]}{dt}&= -k_I [A] [Y] - k_{II} [X] [Y] + \frac{1}{2}f k_V [B] [Z] \\ \frac{d [Z]}{dt}&=  2k_{III} [A] [X] - k_V [B] [Z] \end{align}$$	A type of autocatalytic reaction modelled at constant concentration	

== Biology and medicine ==
Name	Order	Equation	Applications	Reference
Allee effect	1	$\frac{dN}{dt} = -r N \left( 1 - \frac{N}{A} \right) \left( 1 - \frac{N}{K} \right)$	Population biology	
Arditi–Ginzburg equations	1	$$\begin{align} \frac{dN}{dt} &= f(N)\,N-g{\left(\!\tfrac N P \!\right)}P\\ \frac{dP}{dt} &= e \,g{\left(\!\tfrac N P\! \right)}P-uP \end{align}$$	Population dynamics	
FitzHugh–Nagumo model or Bonhoeffer-van der Pol model	1	$$\begin{align} \dot{v}&=v-\frac{v^3}{3} - w + RI_{\rm ext}\\ \tau \dot{w} &= v+a-b w \end{align}$$	Action potentials in neurons, oscillators	
Hodgkin-Huxley equations	1	$$\begin{align} I &= C_m\frac{{\mathrm d} V_m}{{\mathrm d} t}  + \bar{g}_\text{K}n^4(V_m - V_K) + \bar{g}_\text{Na}m^3h(V_m - V_{Na}) + \bar{g}_l(V_m - V_l)\\ \frac{dn}{dt} &= \alpha_n(V_m)(1 - n) - \beta_n(V_m) n\\ \frac{dm}{dt} &= \alpha_m(V_m)(1 - m)  - \beta_m(V_m) m\\ \frac{dh}{dt} &= \alpha_h(V_m)(1 - h) - \beta_h(V_m) h \end{align}$$	Action potentials in neurons	
Kuramoto model	1	$\frac{d \theta_i}{d t} = \omega_i + \frac{1}{N} \sum_{j=1}^{N} K_{ij} \sin(\theta_j - \theta_i), \qquad i = 1 \ldots N$	Synchronization, coupled oscillators	
Lotka–Volterra equations	1	$$\begin{align} \frac{dx}{dt} &= \alpha x - \beta xy\\ \frac{dy}{dt} &= \delta xy - \gamma y \end{align}$$	Population dynamics	
Price equation	1	${d\over{dt}}\mathbb{E}(x) = \underbrace{\text{Cov}(x,f)}_{\text{Selection effect}} + \underbrace{\mathbb{E}(\dot{x})}_{\text{Dynamic effect}}$	Evolution and change in allele frequency over time	
SIR model	1	$$\begin{align} \frac{dS}{dt} &= - \beta S I\\ \frac{dI}{dt} &= \beta S I - \gamma I\\ \frac{dR}{dt} &= \gamma I \end{align}$$	Epidemiology	

== Economics and finance ==
Name	Order	Equation	Applications	Reference
Bass diffusion model	1	$\frac{dF}{dt} = (1-F)(p+qF)$	A Riccati equation used in marketing to describe product adoption	
Ramsey–Cass–Koopmans model	1	$$\begin{align} \dot{k} &=f(k) - (n + \delta)k - c\\ \dot{c} &= \sigma(c) \left[ f_k(k) - \delta - \rho \right] \cdot c \end{align}$$	Neoclassical economics model of economic growth	
Solow–Swan model	1	$\dot{k}(t) = sk(t)^{\alpha} - (n + g + \delta)k(t)$	Model of long run economic growth	

== See also ==
- List of linear ordinary differential equations
- List of nonlinear partial differential equations
- List of named differential equations
- List of stochastic differential equations
