= Darboux differential equation =

Type of ordinary differential equation

In mathematics, a differential equation is called Darboux differential equation if it satisfies the form

$M(x, y) dx - L(x, y) dy + N(x, y) (x dy - y dx) = 0$.

where $M(x, y)$, $L(x, y)$ and $N(x, y)$ are polynomials of $x$ and $y$.

The explicit form of this equation is

$y'(x) = \frac {y N(x, y) - M(x, y)} {x N(x, y) - L(x, y)}$.

which, compared to the aforementioned form, may also include equillibrium points, which must satisfy the following:

$$\begin{cases}
y L(x, y) - x M(x, y) = 0 \\
L = x N(x, y)
\end{cases}$$

== The solution ==
=== General case ===
Since the Darboux equation is effectively the gereralization of the Riccati equation, the solution to it, generally speaking, cannot be found in quadratures. Darboux equation can be solved in very specific cases where certain amount of particular irreducable polynomial solutions $\check{P}_{i}(x, y)$, $1 \leqslant i \leqslant p$ are found. Let $m = \max(\deg M, \deg L, \deg N)$.

==== Case 1. ====
If $p \geqslant \frac {1} {2} m (m + 1) + 2$, the general solution has the form of $u(x, y) = C$, where $u(x, y) = \prod_{i=1}^p {g(x, y, z)^{\alpha_{i}}}$, $g_{i}(x, y, z) = \check{P}_{i}\left( \frac {x} {z}, \frac {y} {z} \right) z^{\deg \check{P}_{i}}$, $\alpha_{i}$ are constants to be determined and variable $z$ in this product vanishes.

==== Case 2. ====
If $p = \frac {1} {2} m (m + 1) + 1$, given Darboux equation allows the integrating factor to be found. This factor has the exact form, as the $u(x, y)$ above.

=== Homogenous case. ===
If three polynomials $M(x, y)$, $L(x, y)$ and $N(x, y)$ happen to be homogenous and $M(x, y)$ with $L(x, y)$ are of the same degree, the exact solution can be expressed and found in quadratures.

Denote $\deg M = \deg L = k$, $\deg N = n$.

Case, where $k - n = 1$, makes whole equation homogenous.

In any other situation substituting $y(x) = x t(x)$ leads to the equation of Bernoulli type over the inverse function $x = x(t)$.

Since $M(x, y)$, $L(x, y)$ and $N(x, y)$ are homogenous with degrees $k$, $k$ and $n$ respectively, there exist polynomials $\mu(t)$, $\lambda(t)$ and $\nu(t)$, such as

$M(x, y) = x^{k} \mu\left(\frac {y} {x}\right) = x^{k} \mu(t)$, $L(x, y) = x^{k} \lambda\left(\frac {y} {x}\right) = x^{k} \lambda(t)$, and $N(x, y) = x^{n} \nu\left(\frac {y} {x}\right) = x^{n} \nu(t)$.

Putting everything together yields $x t'(x) = \frac {x^{n + 1} t \nu(t) - x^{k} \mu(t)} {x^{n + 1} \nu(t) - x^{k}\nu(t)} - t = \frac {x^{k} \big( \lambda(t) - \mu(t) \big)} {x^{n + 1} \nu(t) - x^{k} \lambda(t)} = \frac {\lambda(t) - \mu(t)} {x^{n + 1 - k} \nu(t) - \lambda(t)}$.

If $k - n = 1$ the resulting equation is separable, while in any other case, according to the inverse function rule,

$x'(t) + \frac {\lambda(t)} {\lambda(t) - \mu(t)} x(t) = \frac {\nu(t)} {\lambda(t) - \mu(t)} \big(x(t)\big)^{n + 2 - k}$.

The latter is the Bernoulli equation, which is always integrable in quadratures.

== Generalized Darboux equation ==
The differential equation is called generalized (homogenous) Darboux equation if it has the form of

$\phi\left( \frac {y} {x} \right) dx + \psi \left( \frac {y} {x} \right) dy + x^{k} \chi \left( \frac {y} {x} \right) (x dy - y dx) = 0$

where functions $\phi( \frac {y} {x}) = \phi(t)$, $\psi( \frac {y} {x}) = \psi(t)$ and $\chi( \frac {y} {x}) = \chi(t)$ are arbitrary.

It can be reduced to Bernoulli equation by following the same approach, mentioned above. Substituting $y(x) = x t(x)$ leads to the equation

$\big( \phi(t) + t \psi(t) \big) dx + \big( x\psi(t) + x^{k + 2} \chi(t) \big) dt = 0$

or in the explicit form

$x'(t) + \frac {\psi(t)} {\phi(t) + t \psi(t)} x(t) + \frac {\chi(t)} {\phi(t) + t \psi(t)} \big(x(t)\big)^{k + 2} = 0$

which is either separable if $k = -2$, or the Bernoulli equation over $x = x(t)$ otherwise.

== See also ==
- List of nonlinear ordinary differential equations
- Jacobi differential equation
