= List of named differential equations =

Differential equations play a prominent role in many scientific areas: mathematics, physics, engineering, chemistry, biology, medicine, economics, etc. This list presents differential equations that have received specific names, area by area.

== Mathematics ==
- Ablowitz-Kaup-Newell-Segur (AKNS) system
- Clairaut's equation
- Hypergeometric differential equation
- Jimbo–Miwa–Ueno isomonodromy equations
- Painlevé equations
- Picard–Fuchs equation to describe the periods of elliptic curves
- Schlesinger's equations
- Sine-Gordon equation
- Sturm–Liouville theory of orthogonal polynomials and separable partial differential equations
- Universal differential equation

=== Algebraic geometry ===
- Calabi flow in the study of Calabi-Yau manifolds

=== Complex analysis ===
- Cauchy–Riemann equations

=== Differential geometry ===
- Equations for a minimal surface
- Liouville's equation
- Ricci flow, used to prove the Poincaré conjecture
- Tzitzeica equation

=== Dynamical systems and Chaos theory ===
- Lorenz equations
- Rabinovich–Fabrikant equations

=== Mathematical physics ===
- General Legendre equation
- Heat equation
- Ishimori equation, an integrable nonlinear spin field equation in 2+1 dimensions
- Laplace's equation in potential theory
- Poisson's equation in potential theory

=== Ordinary Differential Equations (ODEs) ===
- Bernoulli differential equation
- Cauchy–Euler equation
- Riccati equation
- Hill differential equation

=== Riemannian geometry ===
- Gauss–Codazzi equations

== Physics ==
=== Astrophysics ===
- Chandrasekhar's white dwarf equation
- Lane-Emden equation
- Emden–Chandrasekhar equation
- Hénon–Heiles system

=== Classical mechanics ===
- Equation of motion
- Euler's rotation equations in rigid body dynamics
- Euler–Lagrange equation
  - Beltrami identity
- Hamilton's equations
- Hamilton-Jacobi equation
- Lorenz equations in chaos theory
- n-body problem in celestial mechanics
- Wave action in continuum mechanics

=== Electromagnetism ===
- Bloch equations
- Continuity equation for conservation laws
- Maxwell's equations
- Poynting's theorem

=== Fluid dynamics and hydrology ===
- Acoustic theory
- Benjamin–Bona–Mahony equation
- Biharmonic equation
- Blasius boundary layer
- Boussinesq approximation (buoyancy)
- Boussinesq approximation (water waves)
- Buckley–Leverett equation
- Camassa–Holm equation
- Chaplygin's equation
- Continuity equation for conservation laws
- Convection–diffusion equation
  - Double diffusive convection
- Davey–Stewartson equation
- Euler–Tricomi equation
- Falkner–Skan boundary layer
- Gardner equation in hydrodynamics
- General equation of heat transfer
- Geophysical fluid dynamics
  - Potential vorticity
  - Quasi-geostrophic equations
  - Shallow water equations
  - Taylor–Goldstein equation
- Groundwater flow equation
  - Richards equation
- Hicks equation
- Kadomtsev–Petviashvili equation in nonlinear wave motion
- KdV equation
- Magnetohydrodynamics
  - Grad–Shafranov equation
- Navier–Stokes equations
  - Euler equations
  - Burgers' equation
- Nonlinear Schrödinger equation in water waves
- Omega equation
- Orr–Sommerfeld equation
- Porous medium equation
- Potential flow
- Rayleigh–Bénard convection
- Rayleigh–Plesset equation
- Reynolds-averaged Navier–Stokes (RANS) equations
- Reynolds equation
- Reynolds transport theorem
- Riemann problem
- Taylor–von Neumann–Sedov blast wave
- Turbulence modeling
  - Turbulence kinetic energy (TKE)
  - K-epsilon turbulence model
  - k–omega turbulence model
  - Spalart–Allmaras turbulence model
- Vorticity equation
- Whitham equation
- Zebiak-Cane model for El Niño–Southern Oscillation
- Zeldovich–Taylor flow

=== General relativity ===
- Einstein field equations
- Friedmann equations
- Geodesic equation
- Mathisson–Papapetrou–Dixon equations
- Schrödinger–Newton equation

=== Materials science ===
- Ginzburg–Landau equations in superconductivity
- London equations in superconductivity
- Poisson–Boltzmann equation in molecular dynamics

=== Nuclear physics ===
- Radioactive decay equations

=== Plasma physics ===
- Gardner equation
- Hasegawa–Mima equation
- KdV equation
- Kuramoto–Sivashinsky equation
- Parker transport equation
- Vlasov equation

=== Quantum mechanics and quantum field theory ===
- Dirac equation, the relativistic wave equation for electrons and positrons
- Gardner equation
- Klein–Gordon equation
- Knizhnik–Zamolodchikov equations in quantum field theory
- Nonlinear Schrödinger equation in quantum mechanics
- Schrödinger equation
- Schwinger–Dyson equation
- Yang-Mills equations in gauge theory

=== Thermodynamics and statistical mechanics ===
- Boltzmann equation
- Continuity equation for conservation laws
- Diffusion equation
  - Heat equation
- Kardar-Parisi-Zhang equation
- Kuramoto–Sivashinsky equation
- Liñán's equation as a model of diffusion flame
- Maxwell relations
- Zeldovich–Frank-Kamenetskii equation to model flame propagation

=== Waves (mechanical or electromagnetic) ===
- D'Alembert's wave equation
- Eikonal equation in wave propagation
- Euler–Poisson–Darboux equation in wave theory
- Helmholtz equation

== Engineering ==
=== Electrical and Electronic Engineering ===
- Chua's circuit
- Liénard equation to model oscillating circuits
- Nonlinear Schrödinger equation in fiber optics
- Telegrapher's equations
- Van der Pol oscillator

=== Game theory ===
- Differential game equations

=== Mechanical engineering ===
- Euler–Bernoulli beam theory
- Timoshenko beam theory

=== Nuclear engineering ===
- Neutron diffusion equation

=== Optimal control ===
- Linear-quadratic regulator
- Matrix differential equation
- PDE-constrained optimization
- Riccati equation
- Shape optimization

=== Orbital mechanics ===
- Clohessy–Wiltshire equations
- Planar reentry equations

=== Signal processing ===
- Filtering theory
  - Kushner equation
  - Zakai equation
- Rudin-Osher-Fatemi equation in total variation denoising

=== Transportation engineering ===
- Law of conservation in the kinematic wave model of traffic flow theory

== Chemistry ==
- Allen–Cahn equation in phase separation
- Cahn–Hilliard equation in phase separation
- Chemical reaction model
  - Brusselator
  - Oregonator
- Master equation
- Rate equation
- Streeter–Phelps equation in water quality modeling

== Biology and medicine ==
- Allee effect in population ecology
- Bidomain model in cardiology
- Chemotaxis in wound healing
- Compartmental models in epidemiology
  - SIR model
  - SIS model
- Hagen–Poiseuille equation in blood flow
- Hodgkin–Huxley model in neural action potentials
- Kardar–Parisi–Zhang equation for bacteria surface growth models
- Kermack-McKendrick theory in infectious disease epidemiology
- Kuramoto model in biological and chemical oscillations
- Mackey-Glass equations
- McKendrick–von Foerster equation in age structure modeling
- Nernst–Planck equation in ion flux across biological membranes
- Price equation in evolutionary biology
- Reaction-diffusion equation in theoretical biology
  - Fisher–KPP equation in nonlinear traveling waves
  - FitzHugh–Nagumo model in neural activation
  - Swift-Hohenberg equation in pattern formation
- Replicator dynamics in theoretical biology
- Verhulst equation in biological population growth
- von Bertalanffy model in biological individual growth
- Wilson–Cowan model in computational neuroscience

=== Population dynamics ===
- Arditi–Ginzburg equations to describe predator–prey dynamics
- Kolmogorov–Petrovsky–Piskunov equation (also known as Fisher's equation) to model population growth
- Logistic differential equation, for population growth
  - Generalized logistic differential equation for growth modeling
- Lotka–Volterra equations to describe the dynamics of biological systems in which two species interact

== Economics and finance ==
- Bass diffusion model
- Black–Scholes equation
- Economic growth
  - Solow–Swan model
    - $k'(t) = s [k(t)]^\alpha - \delta k(t)$
  - Ramsey–Cass–Koopmans model
  - Dynamic stochastic general equilibrium
- Feynman–Kac formula
  - Black–Scholes equation
  - Affine term structure modeling
- Fokker–Planck equation
  - Dupire equation (local volatility)
- Hamilton–Jacobi–Bellman equation
  - Merton's portfolio problem
  - Optimal stopping
- Malthusian growth model
- Mean field game theory
- Optimal rotation age
- Sovereign debt accumulation
  - $\dot{D} = rD + G(t)-T(t)$
- Stochastic differential equation
  - Geometric Brownian motion
  - Ornstein–Uhlenbeck process
  - Cox–Ingersoll–Ross model
- Vidale–Wolfe advertising model

== Linguistics ==
- Replicator dynamics in evolutionary linguistics

== Military strategy ==
- Lanchester's laws in combat modeling
