= Bernoulli equation =

Bernoulli equation may refer to:

- Bernoulli differential equation
- Bernoulli's equation, in fluid dynamics
- Euler–Bernoulli beam equation, in solid mechanics
