= List of linear ordinary differential equations =

This is a list of named linear ordinary differential equations.

== A–Z ==
Name	Order	Equation	Applications
Airy	2	$\frac{d^2y}{dx^2} - xy = 0$	Optics
Bessel	2	$x^2 \frac{d^2 y}{dx^2} + x \frac{dy}{dx} + \left(x^2 - \alpha^2 \right)y = 0$	Wave propagation
Cauchy-Euler	n	$a_{n} x^n y^{(n)}(x) + a_{n-1} x^{n-1} y^{(n-1)}(x) + \dots + a_0 y(x) = 0$	
Chebyshev	2	$(1 - x^2)y'' - xy' + n^2 y = 0,\quad(1 - x^2)y'' - 3xy' + n(n + 2) y = 0$	Orthogonal polynomials
Damped harmonic oscillator	2	$m \frac{\mathrm{d}^2x}{\mathrm{d}t^2}+ c\frac{\mathrm{d}x}{\mathrm{d}t} +kx =0$	Damping
Frenet-Serret	1	$\dfrac{ \mathrm{d} \mathbf{T} }{ \mathrm{d} s } =\kappa \mathbf{N},\quad \dfrac{ \mathrm{d} \mathbf{N} }{ \mathrm{d} s } = -\kappa \mathbf{T} +\, \tau \mathbf{B},\quad \dfrac{ \mathrm{d} \mathbf{B} }{ \mathrm{d} s } = -\tau \mathbf{N}$	Differential geometry
General Laguerre	2	$xy'' + (\alpha + 1 - x)y' + ny = 0$	Hydrogen atom
General Legendre	2	$\left(1 - x^2\right) \frac{d^2}{d x^2} P_\ell^m(x) - 2 x \frac{d}{d x} P_\ell^m(x) + \left[ \ell (\ell + 1) - \frac{m^2}{1 - x^2} \right] P_\ell^m(x) = 0$	
Harmonic oscillator	2	$m \frac{\mathrm{d}^2x}{\mathrm{d}t^2} +k x =0$	Simple harmonic motion
Heun	2	$\frac {d^2w}{dz^2} + \left[\frac{\gamma}{z}+ \frac{\delta}{z-1} + \frac{\epsilon}{z-a} \right] \frac {dw}{dz} + \frac {\alpha \beta z -q} {z(z-1)(z-a)} w = 0$	
Hill	2	$\frac{d^2y}{dt^2} + f(t) y = 0$, (f periodic)	Physics
Hypergeometric	2	$z(1-z)\frac {d^2w}{dz^2} + \left[c-(a+b+1)z \right] \frac {dw}{dz} - ab\,w = 0$	
Kummer	2	$z\frac{d^2w}{dz^2} + (b-z)\frac{dw}{dz} - aw = 0$	
Laguerre	2	$xy'' + (1 - x)y' + ny = 0$	
Legendre	2	$(1 - x^2) P_n''(x) - 2 x P_n'(x) + n (n + 1) P_n(x) = 0$	Orthogonal polynomials
Matrix	1	$\mathbf{\dot{x}}(t) = \mathbf{A}(t)\mathbf{x}(t)$	
Picard-Fuchs	2	$\frac{d^2y}{dj^2} + \frac{1}{j} \frac{dy}{dj} + \frac{31j -4}{144j^2(1-j)^2} y=0$	Elliptic curves
Riemann	2	$\frac{d^2w}{dz^2} + \left[ \frac{1-\alpha-\alpha'}{z-a} + \frac{1-\beta-\beta'}{z-b} + \frac{1-\gamma-\gamma'}{z-c} \right] \frac{dw}{dz}$ $$+\left[ \frac{\alpha\alpha' (a-b)(a-c)} {z-a} +\frac{\beta\beta' (b-c)(b-a)} {z-b} +\frac{\gamma\gamma' (c-a)(c-b)} {z-c} \right] \frac{w}{(z-a)(z-b)(z-c)}=0$$	
Quantum harmonic oscillator	2	$-\frac{1}{2}\frac{d^2\psi}{dx^2} + \frac{1}{2} x^2 \psi = E\psi$	Quantum mechanics
Sturm-Liouville	2	$\frac{d}{dx}\!\!\left[\,p(x)\frac{dy}{dx}\right] + q(x)y = -\lambda\, w(x)y,$	Applied mathematics

== See also ==
- List of nonlinear ordinary differential equations
- List of nonlinear partial differential equations
- List of named differential equations
