= Rauch comparison theorem =

Theorem in Riemannian geometry

In Riemannian geometry, the Rauch comparison theorem, named after Harry Rauch, who proved it in 1951, is a fundamental result which relates the sectional curvature of a Riemannian manifold to the rate at which geodesics spread apart. Intuitively, it states that for positive curvature, geodesics tend to converge, while for negative curvature, geodesics tend to spread.

The statement of the theorem involves two Riemannian manifolds, and allows to compare the infinitesimal rate at which geodesics spread apart in the two manifolds, provided that their curvature can be compared. Most of the time, one of the two manifolds is a "comparison model", generally a manifold with constant curvature, and the second one is the manifold under study : a bound (either lower or upper) on its sectional curvature is then needed in order to apply Rauch comparison theorem.

== Statement ==
Let $M, \widetilde{M}$ be Riemannian manifolds, on which are drawn unit speed geodesic segments $\gamma : [0, T] \to M$ and $\widetilde{\gamma} : [0,T] \to \widetilde{M}$. Assume that $\widetilde{\gamma}(0)$ has no conjugate points along $\widetilde{\gamma}$, and let $J, \widetilde{J}$ be two normal Jacobi fields along $\gamma$ and $\widetilde{\gamma}$ such that :

- $J(0) = 0$ and $\widetilde{J}(0) = 0$
- $|D_t J(0)| = \left|\widetilde{D}_t \widetilde{J}(0)\right|$.

If the sectional curvature of every 2-plane $\Pi \subset T_{\gamma(t)} M$containing $\dot{\gamma}(t)$ is less or equal than the sectional curvature of every 2-plane $\widetilde{\Pi} \subset T_{\tilde{\gamma}(t)} \widetilde{M}$ containing $\dot{\widetilde{\gamma}}(t)$, then $|J(t)| \geq |\widetilde{J}(t)|$ for all $t \in [0, T]$.

== Conditions of the theorem ==
The theorem is formulated using Jacobi fields to measure the variation in geodesics. As the tangential part of a Jacobi field is independent of the geometry of the manifold, the theorem focuses on normal Jacobi fields, i.e. Jacobi fields which are orthogonal to the speed vector $\dot{\gamma}(t)$ of the geodesic for all time $t$. Up to reparametrization, every variation of geodesics induces a normal Jacobi field.

Jacobi fields are requested to vanish at time $t=0$ because the theorem measures the infinitesimal divergence (or convergence) of a family of geodesics issued from the same point $\gamma(0)$, and such a family induces a Jacobi field vanishing at $t=0$.

== Analog theorems ==
Under very similar conditions, it is also possible to compare the Hessian of the distance function to a given point. It is also possible to compare the Laplacian of this function (which is the trace of the Hessian), with some additional condition on one of the two manifolds: it is then enough to have an inequality on the Ricci curvature (which is the trace of the curvature tensor).

== See also ==
- Toponogov's theorem
