= Harry Rauch =

American mathematician

Harry E. Rauch
- Born: November 9, 1925; Trenton, New Jersey
- Died: June 18, 1979 (aged 53); White Plains, New York
- Education: Princeton University
- Scientific career
- Fields: Mathematics
- Thesis: Generalizations of some classic theorems to the case of functions of several variables (1948)
- Doctoral advisor: Salomon Bochner

Harry Ernest Rauch (November 9, 1925 – June 18, 1979) was an American mathematician, who worked on complex analysis and differential geometry. He was born in Trenton, New Jersey, and died in White Plains, New York.

Rauch earned his PhD in 1948 from Princeton University under Salomon Bochner with thesis Generalizations of Some Classic Theorems to the Case of Functions of Several Variables. From 1949 to 1951 he was a visiting member of the Institute for Advanced Study. He was in the 1960s a professor at Yeshiva University and from the mid-1970s a professor at the Graduate School of the City University of New York. His research was on differential geometry (especially geodesics on n-dimensional manifolds), Riemann surfaces, and theta functions.

In the early 1950s Rauch made fundamental progress on the quarter-pinched sphere conjecture in differential geometry. In the case of positive sectional curvature and simply connected differential manifolds, Rauch proved that, under the condition that the sectional curvature K does not deviate too much from K = 1, the manifold must be homeomorphic to the sphere (i.e. the case where there is constant sectional curvature K = 1). Rauch's result created a new paradigm in differential geometry, that of a "pinching theorem;" in Rauch's case, the assumption was that the curvature was pinched between 0.76 and 1. This was later relaxed to pinching between 0.55 and 1 by Wilhelm Klingenberg, and finally replaced with the sharp result of pinching between 0.25 and 1 by Marcel Berger and Klingenberg in the early 1960s. This optimal result is known as the sphere theorem for Riemannian manifolds.

The Rauch comparison theorem is also named after Harry Rauch. He proved it in 1951.

== Publications ==
=== Articles ===
- Rauch, H. E. (1951). "A contribution to differential geometry in the large". Annals of Mathematics. 54 (1): 38–55. doi:10.2307/1969309. JSTOR 1969309. MR 0042765.
- Rauch, H. E. (1962). "The singularities of the modulus space" (PDF). Bulletin of the American Mathematical Society. 68 (4): 390–394. doi:10.1090/s0002-9904-1962-10818-0. MR 0141781.
- Rauch, H. E. (1965). "A transcendental view of the space of algebraic Riemann surfaces". Bulletin of the American Mathematical Society. 71 (1): 1–39. doi:10.1090/s0002-9904-1965-11225-3. MR 0213543.
- Rauch, H. E. (1967). "The local ring of the genus three modulus space of Klein's 168 surface" (PDF). Bulletin of the American Mathematical Society. 73 (3): 343–346. doi:10.1090/s0002-9904-1967-11743-9. MR 0213545.
- with Hershel M. Farkas: Rauch, H. E.; Farkas, H. M. (1968). "Relation between two kinds of theta constants on a Riemann surface". Proceedings of the National Academy of Sciences of the United States of America. 59 (1): 52–55. Bibcode:1968PNAS...59...52R. doi:10.1073/pnas.59.1.52. PMC 285999. PMID 16591592.
- Rauch, H. E. (1968). "Functional independence of theta constants". Bulletin of the American Mathematical Society. 74 (4): 633–638. doi:10.1090/s0002-9904-1968-11969-x. MR 0226000.
- with H. M. Farkas: Farkas, H. M.; Rauch, H. E. (1969). "Two kinds of theta constants and period relations on a Riemann surface". Proceedings of the National Academy of Sciences of the United States of America. 62 (3): 679–686. Bibcode:1969PNAS...62..679F. doi:10.1073/pnas.62.3.679. PMC 223651. PMID 16591737.
- with H. M. Farkas: Farkas, Hershel M.; Rauch, Harry E. (1970). "Period relations of Schottky type on Riemann surfaces". Annals of Mathematics. 92 (2): 434–461. doi:10.2307/1970627. JSTOR 1970627. MR 0283193.
- with Isaac Chavel: Chavel, I; Rauch, H. E. (1972). "Holomorphic embedding of complex curves in spaces of constant holomorphic curvature". Proceedings of the National Academy of Sciences of the United States of America. 69 (3): 663–665. Bibcode:1972PNAS...69..633C. doi:10.1073/pnas.69.3.633. PMC 426523. PMID 16591967.

=== Books ===
- with Hershel M. Farkas: Theta functions with applications to Riemann Surfaces, Williams and Wilkins, Baltimore 1974
- with Aaron Lebowitz: Elliptic functions, theta functions and Riemann Surfaces, Williams and Wilkins, 1973
- with Matthew Graber, William Zlot: Elementary Geometry, Krieger 1973, 2nd edn. 1979
- Geodesics and Curvature in Differential Geometry in the Large, Yeshiva University 1959

== Sources ==
- Hershel M. Farkas, Isaac Chavel (eds.): Differential geometry and complex analysis: a volume dedicated to the memory of Harry Ernest Rauch, Springer, 1985
