= Binomial differential equation =

In mathematics, the binomial differential equation is an ordinary differential equation of the form $\left( y' \right)^m = f(x,y),$ where $m$ is a natural number and $f(x,y)$ is a polynomial that is analytic in both variables.

== Solution ==
Let $P(x,y) = (x + y)^k$ be a polynomial of two variables of order $k$, where $k$ is a natural number. By the binomial formula,

$P(x,y) = \sum\limits_{j = 0}^k { \binom{k}{j} x^j y^{k - j} }$.

The binomial differential equation becomes $(y')^m = (x + y)^k$. Substituting $v = x + y$ and its derivative $v' = 1 + y'$ gives $(v'-1)^m = v^k$, which can be written $\tfrac{dv}{dx} = 1 + v^{\tfrac{k}{m}}$, which is a separable ordinary differential equation. Solving gives

$$\begin{array}{lrl} & \frac{dv}{dx} &= 1 + v^{\tfrac{k}{m}} \\
\Rightarrow & \frac{dv}{1 + v^{\tfrac{k}{m}}} &= dx \\
\Rightarrow & \int {\frac{dv}{1 + v^{\tfrac{k}{m}}}} &= x + C
\end{array}$$

=== Special cases ===
- If $m=k$, this gives the differential equation $v' - 1 = v$ and the solution is $y\left( x \right) = Ce^x - x - 1$, where $C$ is a constant.
- If $m|k$ (that is, $m$ is a divisor of $k$), then the solution has the form $\int {\frac{{dv}}{{1 + v^n }}} = x + C$. In the tables book Gradshteyn and Ryzhik, this form decomposes as:

$$\int {\frac{{dv}}{{1 + v^n }}}  = \left\{ \begin{array}{ll}
- \frac{2}{n}\sum\limits_{i = 0}^{{\textstyle{n \over 2}} - 1} {P_i \cos \left( {\frac{{2i + 1}}{n}\pi } \right)} + \frac{2}{n}\sum\limits_{i = 0}^{{\tfrac{n}{2}} - 1} {Q_i \sin \left( {\frac{2i+1}{n}\pi } \right)} , & n:\text{even integer} \\
\\
\frac{1}{n}\ln \left( {1 + v} \right) - \frac{2}{n}\sum\limits_{i = 0}^{{\textstyle{{n - 3} \over 2}}} {P_i \cos \left( {\frac{2i+1}{n}\pi } \right)} + \frac{2}{n}\sum\limits_{i = 0}^{{\tfrac{n-3}{2}}} {Q_i \sin \left( {\frac{2i+1}{n}\pi } \right)} , & n:\text{odd integer} \\
\end{array} \right.$$

where

$$\begin{align}
P_i &= \frac{1}{2}\ln \left( {v^2 - 2v\cos \left( {\frac{{2i + 1}}{n}\pi } \right) + 1} \right) \\
Q_i &= \arctan \left( {\frac{{v - \cos \left( {{\textstyle{{2i + 1} \over n}}\pi } \right)}}{{\sin \left( {{\textstyle{{2i + 1} \over n}}\pi } \right)}}} \right)
\end{align}$$

== See also ==
- Examples of differential equations
