= Abel equation of the first kind =

Ordinary differential equation

In mathematics, an Abel equation of the first kind, named after Niels Henrik Abel, is any ordinary differential equation that is cubic in the unknown function. In other words, it is an equation of the form

$$y'=f_3(x)y^3+f_2(x)y^2+f_1(x)y+f_0(x) \,$$

where $f_3(x)\neq 0$.

== Properties ==
If $f_3(x)=0$ and $f_0(x)=0$, or $f_2(x)=0$ and $f_0(x)=0$, the equation reduces to a Bernoulli equation, while if $f_3(x) = 0$ the equation reduces to a Riccati equation.

== Solution ==
The substitution $y=\dfrac{1}{u}$ brings the Abel equation of the first kind to the Abel equation of the second kind, of the form

$$uu'=-f_0(x)u^3-f_1(x)u^2-f_2(x)u-f_3(x). \,$$

The substitution

$$\begin{align}
\xi & = \int f_3(x)E^2~dx, \\[6pt]
u & = \left(y+\dfrac{f_2(x)}{3f_3(x)}\right)E^{-1}, \\[6pt]
E & = \exp\left(\int\left(f_1(x)-\frac{f_2^2(x)}{3f_3(x)}\right)~dx\right)
\end{align}$$

brings the Abel equation of the first kind to the canonical form

$$u'=u^3+\phi(\xi). \,$$

Dimitrios E. Panayotounakos and Theodoros I. Zarmpoutis discovered an analytic method to solve the above equation in an implicit form.
