= Levy–Mises equations =

Relationship between stress and strain

The Levi–Mises equations (also called flow rules) describe the relationship between stress and strain for an ideal plastic solid where the elastic strains are negligible.

The generalized Levy–Mises equation can be written as:

$$\frac{\mathbf{d}\varepsilon_1}{\sigma'_1}=\frac{\mathbf{d}\varepsilon_2}
{\sigma'_2}=\frac{\mathbf{d}\varepsilon_3}{\sigma'_3}=\mathbf{d}\lambda$$
