= Conjugate points =

In differential geometry

In differential geometry, conjugate points or focal points are, roughly, points that can almost be joined by a 1-parameter family of geodesics. For example, on a sphere, the north-pole and south-pole are connected by any meridian. Another viewpoint is that conjugate points tell when the geodesics fail to be length-minimizing. All geodesics are locally length-minimizing, but not necessarily globally. For example on a sphere, any geodesic passing through the north-pole can be extended to reach the south-pole, and hence any geodesic segment connecting the poles is not (uniquely) globally length minimizing. This tells us that any pair of antipodal points on the standard 2-sphere are conjugate points.

== Definition ==
Suppose p and q are points on a pseudo-Riemannian manifold, and $\gamma$ is a geodesic that connects p and q. Then p and q are conjugate points along $\gamma$ if there exists a non-zero Jacobi field along $\gamma$ that vanishes at p and q.

Recall that any Jacobi field can be written as the derivative of a geodesic variation (see the article on Jacobi fields). Therefore, if p and q are conjugate along $\gamma$, one can construct a family of geodesics that start at p and almost end at q. In particular, if $\gamma_s(t)$ is the family of geodesics whose derivative in s at $s=0$ generates the Jacobi field J, then the end point of the variation, namely $\gamma_s(1)$, is the point q only up to first order in s. Therefore, if two points are conjugate, it is not necessary that there exist two distinct geodesics joining them.

For Riemannian geometries, beyond a conjugate point, the geodesic is no longer locally the shortest path between points, as there are nearby paths that are shorter. This is analogous to the Earth's surface, where the geodesic between two points along a great circle is the shortest route only up to the antipodal point; beyond that, there are shorter paths.

Beyond a conjugate point, a geodesic in Lorentzian geometry may not be maximizing proper time (for timelike geodesics), and the geodesic may enter a region where it is no longer unique or well-defined. For null geodesics, points beyond the conjugate point are now timelike separated.

Up to the first conjugate point, a geodesic between two points is unique. Beyond this, there can be multiple geodesics connecting two points.

Suppose we have a Lorentzian manifold with a geodesic congruence. Then, at a conjugate point, the expansion parameter θ in Raychaudhuri's equation becomes negative infinite in a finite amount of proper time, indicating that the geodesics are focusing to a point. This is because the cross-sectional area of the congruence becomes zero, and hence the rate of change of this area (which is what θ represents) diverges negatively.

== Examples ==
- On the sphere $S^2$, antipodal points are conjugate.
- On the real coordinate space $\mathbb{R}^n$, there are no conjugate points.
- On Riemannian manifolds with non-positive sectional curvature, there are no conjugate points.

== See also ==
- Cut locus
- Jacobi field
- Aurora § Conjugate auroras
- Operation Argus § USS Albemarle
