= Singular solution =

A singular solution y_{s}(x) of an ordinary differential equation is a solution that is singular or one for which the initial value problem (also called the Cauchy problem by some authors) fails to have a unique solution at some point on the solution. The set on which a solution is singular may be as small as a single point or as large as the full real line. Solutions which are singular in the sense that the initial value problem fails to have a unique solution need not be singular functions.

In some cases, the term singular solution is used to mean a solution at which there is a failure of uniqueness to the initial value problem at every point on the curve. A singular solution in this stronger sense is often given as tangent to every solution from a family of solutions. By tangent we mean that there is a point x where y_{s}(x) = y_{c}(x) and y'_{s}(x) = y'_{c}(x) where y_{c} is a solution in a family of solutions parameterized by c. This means that the singular solution is the envelope of the family of solutions.

Usually, singular solutions appear in differential equations when there is a need to divide in a term that might be equal to zero. Therefore, when one is solving a differential equation and using division one must check what happens if the term is equal to zero, and whether it leads to a singular solution. The Picard–Lindelöf theorem, which gives sufficient conditions for unique solutions to exist, can be used to rule out the existence of singular solutions. Other theorems, such as the Peano existence theorem, give sufficient conditions for solutions to exist without necessarily being unique, which can allow for the existence of singular solutions.

== A divergent solution ==
Consider the homogeneous linear ordinary differential equation

$$xy'(x) +2y(x)= 0 , \,\!$$

where primes denote derivatives with respect to x. The general solution to this equation is

$$y(x)= C x^{-2} . \,\!$$

For a given $C$, this solution is smooth except at $x=0$ where the solution is divergent. Furthermore, for a given $x\not=0$, this is the unique solution going through $(x,y(x))$.

== Failure of uniqueness ==
Consider the differential equation

$$y'(x)^2 = 4y(x) . \,\!$$

A one-parameter family of solutions to this equation is given by

$$y_c(x) = (x-c)^2 . \,\!$$

Another solution is given by

$$y_s(x) = 0 . \,\!$$

Since the equation being studied is a first-order equation, the initial conditions are the initial x and y values. By considering the two sets of solutions above, one can see that the solution fails to be unique when $y=0$. (It can be shown that for $y>0$ if a single branch of the square root is chosen, then there is a local solution which is unique using the Picard–Lindelöf theorem.) Thus, the solutions above are all singular solutions, in the sense that solution fails to be unique in a neighbourhood of one or more points. (Commonly, we say "uniqueness fails" at these points.) For the first set of solutions, uniqueness fails at one point, $x=c$, and for the second solution, uniqueness fails at every value of $x$. Thus, the solution $y_s$ is a singular solution in the stronger sense that uniqueness fails at every value of x. However, it is not a singular function since it and all its derivatives are continuous.

In this example, the solution $y_s(x)=0$ is the envelope of the family of solutions $y_c(x)=(x-c)^2$. The solution $y_s$ is tangent to every curve $y_c(x)$ at the point $(c,0)$.

The failure of uniqueness can be used to construct more solutions. These can be found by taking two constant $c_1 < c_2$ and defining a solution $y(x)$ to be $(x-c_1)^2$ when $x < c_1$, to be $0$ when $c_1\leq x\leq c_2$, and to be $(x-c_2)^2$ when $x > c_2$. Direct calculation shows that this is a solution of the differential equation at every point, including $x=c_1$ and $x=c_2$. Uniqueness fails for these solutions on the interval $c_1\leq x\leq c_2$, and the solutions are singular, in the sense that the second derivative fails to exist, at $x=c_1$ and $x=c_2$.

== Further example of failure of uniqueness ==
The previous example might give the erroneous impression that failure of uniqueness is directly related to $y(x)=0$. Failure of uniqueness can also be seen in the following example of a Clairaut's equation:

$$y(x) = x \cdot y' + (y')^2 \,\!$$

We write y' = p and then

$$y(x) = x \cdot p + (p)^2.$$

Now, we shall take the differential according to x:

$$p  = y' = p + x p' + 2 p p'$$

which by simple algebra yields

$$0 = ( 2 p + x )p'.$$

This condition is solved if $( 2 p + x )=0$ or $p'=0$.

If p' = 0 it means that y' = p = c = constant, and the general solution of this new equation is:

$$y_c(x) = c \cdot x + c^2$$

where c is determined by the initial value.

If x + 2p = 0 then we get that p = −½x and substituting in the ODE gives

$$y_s(x) = (-\tfrac{1}{2}x)*x + (-\tfrac{1}{2}x)^2 = -\tfrac{1}{4} x^2.$$

Now we shall check when these solutions are singular solutions. If two solutions intersect each other, that is, they both go through the same point (x,y), then there is a failure of uniqueness for a first-order ordinary differential equation. Thus, there will be a failure of uniqueness if a solution of the first form intersects the second solution.

The condition of intersection is : y_{s}(x) = y_{c}(x). We solve

$$c \cdot x + c^2 = y_c(x) = y_s(x) = -\tfrac{1}{4} x^2$$

to find the intersection point, which is $(-2c , -c^2)$.

We can verify that the curves are tangent at this point y'_{s}(x) = y'_{c}(x). We calculate the derivatives:

$$y_c'(-2 c) = c \,\!$$
$$y_s'(-2 c) = -\tfrac{1}{2} x |_{x = -2 c} = c. \,\!$$

Hence,

$$y_s(x) = -\tfrac{1}{4} \cdot x^2 \,\!$$

is tangent to every member of the one-parameter family of solutions

$$y_c(x) = c \cdot x + c^2 \,\!$$

of this Clairaut equation:

$$y(x) = x \cdot y' + (y')^2. \,\!$$

== See also ==
- Chandrasekhar equation
- Chrystal's equation
- Caustic (mathematics)
- Envelope (mathematics)
- Initial value problem
- Picard–Lindelöf theorem

== Bibliography ==
- Rozov, N.Kh. (2001) [1994], "Singular solution", Encyclopedia of Mathematics, EMS Press
