= Thermochemical equation =

Chemical equation showing the transfer of energy to/from outside the system

In thermochemistry, a thermochemical equation is a balanced chemical equation that represents the energy changes from a system to its surroundings. One such equation involves the enthalpy change, which is denoted with $\Delta H$ In variable form, a thermochemical equation would appear similar to the following:

$$A + B \to C$$
$$\Delta H = e\ \frac{\text{kJ}}{\text{mol}}$$

$A$, $B$, and $C$ are the usual agents of a chemical equation with coefficients and $e$ is a positive or negative numerical value, which generally has units of kJ/mol. Another equation may include the symbol $E$ to denote energy; $E$'s position determines whether the reaction is considered endothermic (energy-absorbing) or exothermic (energy-releasing).

$$A + E \to C \quad \text{(Endothermic; } E\text{ is a reactant.)}$$

$$A \to C + E \quad \text{(Exothermic; } E\text{ is a product.)}$$

== Understanding aspects of thermochemical equations ==
Enthalpy ($H$) is the transfer of energy in a reaction (for chemical reactions, it is in the form of heat) and $\Delta H$ is the change in enthalpy. $\Delta H$ is a state function, meaning that $\Delta H$ is independent of processes occurring between initial and final states. In other words, it does not matter which steps are taken to get from initial reactants to final products, as $\Delta H$ will always be the same. $\Delta H_{\text{rxn}}$, or the change in enthalpy of a reaction, has the same value of $\Delta H$ as in a thermochemical equation; however, $\Delta H_{\text{rxn}}$ is measured in units of kJ/mol, meaning that it is the enthalpy change per moles of any particular substance in an equation. Values of $\Delta H$ are determined experimentally under standard conditions of 1 atm and 25 °C (298.15K).

As discussed earlier, $\Delta H$ can have a positive or negative sign. If $\Delta H$ has a positive sign, the system uses heat and is endothermic; if $\Delta H$ is negative, then heat is produced and the system is exothermic.

$$\begin{align}
&\text{Endothermic:} &A+B+\text{Heat} \to C,\quad &\Delta H > 0\\
&\text{Exothermic:} &A+B \to C+\text{Heat}, \quad &\Delta H < 0
\end{align}$$

Since enthalpy is a state function, the $\Delta H$ given for a particular reaction is only true for that exact reaction. Physical states of reactants and products matter, as do molar concentrations.

Since $\Delta H$ is dependent on the physical state and molar concentrations in reactions, thermochemical equations must be stoichiometrically correct. If one agent of an equation is changed through multiplication, then all agents must be proportionally changed, including $\Delta H$.

The multiplicative property of thermochemical equations is mainly due to the first law of thermodynamics, which says that energy can neither be created nor destroyed; this concept is commonly known as the conservation of energy. It holds true on a physical or molecular scale.

== Manipulating thermochemical equations ==
=== Coefficient multiplication ===
Thermochemical equations can be changed, as mentioned above, by multiplying by any numerical coefficient. All agents must be multiplied, including $\Delta H$. Using the thermochemical equation of variables as above, one gets the following example.

$$A + B \to C$$
$$\Delta H = e\ \frac{\text{kJ}}{\text{mol}}$$

One must assume that $A$ needs to be multiplied by two in order for the thermochemical equation to be used. All the agents in the reaction must then be multiplied by the same coefficient, like so:

$$2A + 2B \to 2C$$

$$2\Delta H= 2e \ \frac{\text{kJ}}{\text{mol}}$$

This is again considered to be logical when the first law of thermodynamics is considered. Twice as much product is produced, so twice as much heat is removed or given off. The division of coefficients functions in the same way.

=== Hess's law: Addition of thermochemical equations ===
Hess's law states that the sum of the energy changes of all thermochemical equations included in an overall reaction is equal to the overall energy change. Since $\Delta H$ is a state function and is not dependent on how reactants become products as a result, steps (in the form of several thermochemical equations) can be used to find the $\Delta H$ of the overall reaction. For instance:

$\ce{Reaction\ 1: \quad C_{graphite}(s)\ + O2 (g) \to CO2 (g)}$

This reaction is the result of two steps (a reaction sequence):

$\ce{C_{graphite} (s) \ + \frac{1}{2}O2 (g) \to CO(g)}$

$\Delta H = -110.5 \ \frac{\text{kJ}}{\text{mol}}$

$\ce{CO(g)\ + \frac{1}{2}O2(g) \to CO2 (g)}$

$\Delta H = -283.0 \ \frac{\text{kJ}}{\text{mol}}$

Adding these two reactions together results in Reaction 1, which allows $\Delta H$ to be found, so whether or not agents in the reaction sequence are equal to each other is verified. The reaction sequences are then added together. In the following example, $\ce{CO}$ is not in Reaction 1 and equals another reaction.

$\ce{C_{graphite} (s) \ + \frac{1}{2} O2 (g) \ + \frac{1}{2} O2 (g) \to CO2(g)}$

and

$\ce{C_{graphite} (s) \ + O2 (g) \to CO2(g), \ Reaction \ 1}$

To solve for $\Delta H$, the $\Delta H$s of the two equations in the reaction sequence are added together:

$\Delta H = -110.5 + -283.0 = -393.5 \ \frac{\text{kJ}}{\text{mol}}$

Another example involving thermochemical equations is that when methane gas is combusted, heat is released, making the reaction exothermic. In the process, 890.4 kJ of heat is released per mole of reactants, so the heat is written as a product of the reaction.

=== Other notes ===
- If reactions have to be reversed for their products to be equal, the sign of $\Delta H$ must also be reversed.
- If an agent has to be multiplied for it to equal another agent, all other agents and $\Delta H$ must also be multiplied by its coefficient.
- Generally, $\Delta H$ values given in tables are under 1 atm and 25 °C (298.15 K), otherwise known as Standard Lab Conditions.

== Locations of values of ΔH ==
Values of $\Delta H$ have been experimentally determined and are available in table form. Most general chemistry textbooks have appendixes including common $\Delta H$ values. There are several online tables available. A software offered with Active Thermochemical Tables (ATcT) provides more information online.

== See also ==
- Chemistry
- Thermochemistry
- Chemical reaction
- Enthalpy
