= Chrystal's equation =

Ordinary differential equation

In mathematics, Chrystal's equation is a first order nonlinear ordinary differential equation, named after the mathematician George Chrystal, who discussed the singular solution of this equation in 1896. The equation reads as

$$\left(\frac{dy}{dx}\right)^2 + Ax \frac{dy}{dx} + By + Cx^2 =0$$

where $A,\ B, \ C$ are constants, which upon solving for $dy/dx$, gives

$$\frac{dy}{dx} = -\frac{A}{2} x \pm \frac{1}{2} (A^2 x^2 - 4By - 4Cx^2)^{1/2}.$$

This equation is a generalization of some particular cases of Clairaut's equation since it reduces to a form of Clairaut's equation under certain conditions as given below.

== Solution ==
Introducing the transformation $4By=(A^2-4C-z^2)x^2$ gives

$$xz\frac{dz}{dx} = A^2 + AB - 4C \pm Bz - z^2.$$

Now, the equation is separable, thus

$$\frac{z \, dz}{A^2 + AB - 4C \pm Bz - z^2} = \frac{dx}{x}.$$

The denominator on the left hand side can be factorized if we solve the roots of the equation $A^2 + AB - 4C \pm Bz - z^2=0$ and the roots are $a,\ b = \pm \left[ B +\sqrt{(2A+B)^2 - 16C} \right]/2$, therefore

$$\frac{z \, dz}{-(z-a)(z-b)} = \frac{dx}{x}.$$

If $a\neq b$, the solution is

$$x \frac{(z-a)^{a/(a-b)}}{(z-b)^{b/(a-b)}} = k$$

where $k$ is an arbitrary constant. If $a=b$, ($(2A+B)^2 - 16C=0$) then the solution is

$$x(z-a) \exp \left[\frac a {a-z}\right]=k.$$

When one of the roots is zero, the equation reduces to a special-case of Clairaut's equation and a parabolic solution is obtained in this case, $A^2+ AB -4C=0$ and the solution is

$$x(z\pm B)=k, \quad \Rightarrow \quad 4By = - AB x^2 - (k\pm Bx)^2.$$

The above family of parabolas are enveloped by the parabola $4By=-ABx^2$, therefore this enveloping parabola is a singular solution.
