= D'Alembert's equation =

Type of ordinary differential equation

In mathematics, d'Alembert's equation, sometimes also known as Lagrange's equation, is a first order nonlinear ordinary differential equation, named after the French mathematician Jean le Rond d'Alembert. The equation reads as

$$y = x f\left( \frac{dy}{dx} \right) + g\left( \frac{dy}{dx}\right).$$

After differentiating once, and rearranging with $p=dy/dx$, we have

$$\frac{dx}{dp} + \frac{x f'(p) + g'(p)}{f(p)-p}=0$$

The above equation is a first order linear differential equation:

$$\frac{dx}{dp} + \frac{f'(p)}{f(p)-p}x=\frac{- g'(p)}{f(p)-p}$$

as the general form:

$$\frac{dx}{dp} + R(p) x=Q(p)$$

When $f(p)=p$, d'Alembert's equation is reduced to Clairaut's equation.
