= Clairaut's equation =

Type of ordinary differential equation

In mathematical analysis, Clairaut's equation (or the Clairaut equation) is a differential equation of the form

$$y(x)=x\frac{dy}{dx}+f\left(\frac{dy}{dx}\right)$$

where $f$ is continuously differentiable. It is a particular case of the Lagrange differential equation. It is named after the French mathematician Alexis Clairaut, who introduced it in 1734.

== Solution ==
To solve Clairaut's equation, one differentiates with respect to $x$, yielding

$$\frac{dy}{dx}=\frac{dy}{dx}+x\frac{d^2 y}{dx^2}+f'\left(\frac{dy}{dx}\right)\frac{d^2 y}{dx^2},$$

so

$$\frac{d^2 y}{dx^2}\cdot\left[x+f'\left(\frac{dy}{dx}\right)\right] = 0$$

Hence, either

$\frac{d^2 y}{dx^2} = 0$, or $\left[x+f'\left(\frac{dy}{dx}\right)\right]= 0.$

In the former case, $\frac{dy}{dx}=C$ for some constant $C$. Substituting this into the Clairaut's equation, one obtains the family of straight line functions given by

$$y(x)=Cx+f(C),\,$$

the so-called general solution of Clairaut's equation.

The latter case,

$$\left[x+f'\left(\frac{dy}{dx}\right)\right]= 0$$

defines only one solution $y(x)$, the so-called singular solution, whose graph is the envelope of the graphs of the general solutions. The singular solution is usually represented using parametric notation, as $(x(p), y(p))$, where $p = \frac{dy}{dx}$.

The parametric description of the singular solution has the form

$$x(t)= -f'(t),\,$$
$$y(t)= f(t) - tf'(t),\,$$

where $t$ is a parameter.

== Examples ==
The following curves represent the solutions to two Clairaut's equations:

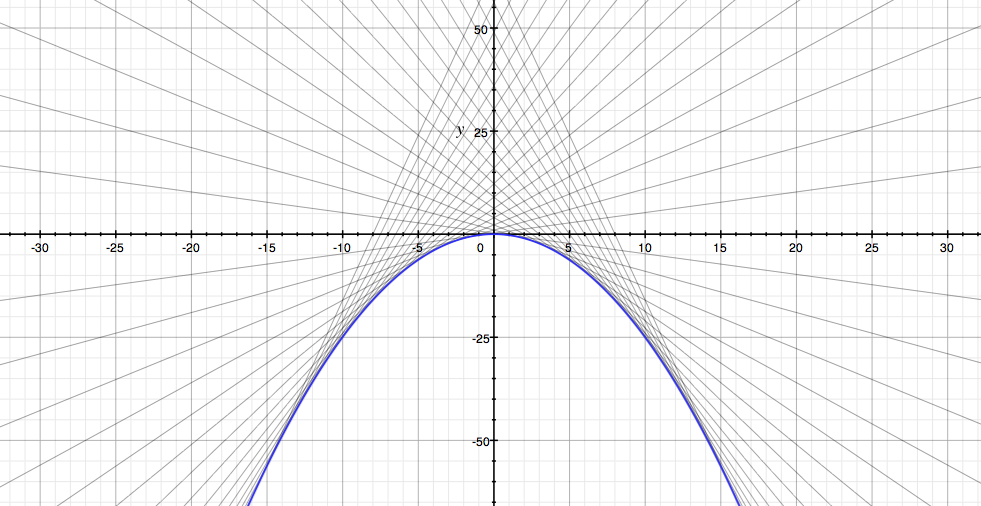
$f(p)=p^2$

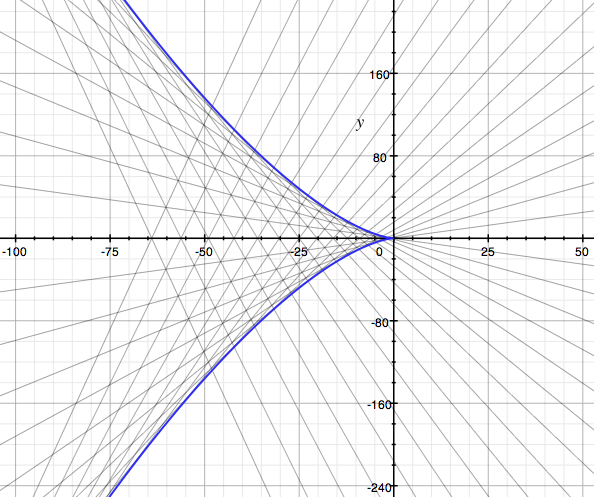
$f(p)=p^3$

In each case, the general solutions are depicted in black while the singular solution is in violet.

== Extension ==
By extension, a first-order partial differential equation of the form

$$\displaystyle u=xu_x+yu_y+f(u_x,u_y)$$

is also known as Clairaut's equation.

== See also ==
- D'Alembert's equation
- Chrystal's equation
- Legendre transformation
