= Euler's differential equation =

Ordinary differential equation

In mathematics, Euler's differential equation is a first-order non-linear ordinary differential equation, named after Leonhard Euler. It is given by:

$$\frac{dy}{dx} + \frac{\sqrt{a_0+a_1y +a_2 y^2 + a_3 y^3 + a_4 y^4}}{\sqrt{a_0+a_1x +a_2 x^2 + a_3 x^3 + a_4 x^4}} = 0$$

This is a separable equation and the solution is given by the following integral equation:

$$\int \frac{dy}{\sqrt{a_0+a_1 y + a_2 y^2 + a_3 y^3 + a_4 y^4}} + \int \frac{dx}{\sqrt{a_0+a_1 x + a_2 x^2 + a_3 x^3 + a_4 x^4}}  = c$$
