= Jacobi field =

Vector field in Riemannian geometry

In Riemannian geometry, a Jacobi field is a vector field along a geodesic $\gamma$ in a Riemannian manifold describing the difference between the geodesic and an "infinitesimally close" geodesic. In other words, the Jacobi fields along a geodesic form the tangent space to the geodesic in the space of all geodesics. They are named after Carl Jacobi.

== Definitions and properties ==
Jacobi fields can be obtained in the following way: Take a smooth one parameter family of geodesics $\gamma_\tau$ with $\gamma_0=\gamma$, then

$$J(t)=\left.\frac{\partial\gamma_\tau(t)}{\partial \tau}\right|_{\tau=0}$$

is a Jacobi field, and describes the behavior of the geodesics in an infinitesimal neighborhood of a given geodesic $\gamma$.

A vector field J along a geodesic $\gamma$ is said to be a Jacobi field if it satisfies the Jacobi equation:

$$\frac{D^2}{dt^2}J(t)+R(J(t),\dot\gamma(t))\dot\gamma(t)=0,$$

where D denotes the covariant derivative with respect to the Levi-Civita connection, R the Riemann curvature tensor, $\dot\gamma(t)=d\gamma(t)/dt$ the tangent vector field, and t is the parameter of the geodesic. On a complete Riemannian manifold, for any Jacobi field there is a family of geodesics $\gamma_\tau$ describing the field (as in the preceding paragraph).

The Jacobi equation is a linear, second order ordinary differential equation; in particular, values of $J$ and $\frac{D}{dt}J$ at one point of $\gamma$ uniquely determine the Jacobi field. Furthermore, the set of Jacobi fields along a given geodesic forms a real vector space of dimension twice the dimension of the manifold.

As trivial examples of Jacobi fields one can consider $\dot\gamma(t)$ and $t\dot\gamma(t)$. These correspond respectively to the following families of reparametrizations: $\gamma_\tau(t)=\gamma(\tau+t)$ and $\gamma_\tau(t)=\gamma((1+\tau)t)$.

Any Jacobi field $J$ can be represented in a unique way as a sum $T+I$, where $T=a\dot\gamma(t)+bt\dot\gamma(t)$ is a linear combination of trivial Jacobi fields and $I(t)$ is orthogonal to $\dot\gamma(t)$, for all $t$. The field $I$ then corresponds to the same variation of geodesics as $J$, only with changed parametrizations.

== Motivating example ==
On a unit sphere, the geodesics through the North pole are great circles. Consider two such geodesics $\gamma_0$ and $\gamma_\tau$ with natural parameter, $t\in [0,\pi]$, separated by an angle $\tau$. The geodesic distance

$$d(\gamma_0(t),\gamma_\tau(t)) \,$$

is

$$d(\gamma_0(t),\gamma_\tau(t))=\sin^{-1}\bigg(\sin t\sin\tau\sqrt{1+\cos^2 t\tan^2(\tau/2)}\bigg).$$

Computing this requires knowing the geodesics. The most interesting information is just that

$d(\gamma_0(\pi),\gamma_\tau(\pi))=0 \,$, for any $\tau$.

Instead, we can consider the derivative with respect to $\tau$ at $\tau=0$:

$$\frac{\partial}{\partial\tau}\bigg|_{\tau=0}d(\gamma_0(t),\gamma_\tau(t))=|J(t)|=\sin t.$$

Notice that we still detect the intersection of the geodesics at $t=\pi$. Notice further that to calculate this derivative we do not actually need to know

$$d(\gamma_0(t),\gamma_\tau(t)) \,$$,

rather, all we need do is solve the equation

$$y''+y=0 \,$$,

for some given initial data.

Jacobi fields give a natural generalization of this phenomenon to arbitrary Riemannian manifolds.

== Solving the Jacobi equation ==
Let $e_1(0)=\dot\gamma(0)/|\dot\gamma(0)|$ and complete this to get an orthonormal basis $\big\{e_i(0)\big\}$ at $T_{\gamma(0)}M$. Parallel transport it to get a basis $\{e_i(t)\}$ all along $\gamma$. This gives an orthonormal basis with $e_1(t)=\dot\gamma(t)/|\dot\gamma(t)|$. The Jacobi field can be written in co-ordinates in terms of this basis as $J(t)=y^k(t)e_k(t)$ and thus

$$\frac{D}{dt}J=\sum_k\frac{dy^k}{dt}e_k(t),\quad\frac{D^2}{dt^2}J=\sum_k\frac{d^2y^k}{dt^2}e_k(t),$$

and the Jacobi equation can be rewritten as a system

$$\frac{d^2y^k}{dt^2}+|\dot\gamma|^2\sum_j y^j(t)\langle R(e_j(t),e_1(t))e_1(t),e_k(t)\rangle=0$$

for each $k$. This way we get a linear ordinary differential equation (ODE). Since this ODE has smooth coefficients we have that solutions exist for all $t$ and are unique, given $y^k(0)$ and ${y^k}'(0)$, for all $k$.

== Examples ==
Consider a geodesic $\gamma(t)$ with parallel orthonormal frame $e_i(t)$, $e_1(t)=\dot\gamma(t)/|\dot\gamma|$, constructed as above.

- The vector fields along $\gamma$ given by $\dot \gamma(t)$ and $t\dot \gamma(t)$ are Jacobi fields.
- In Euclidean space (as well as for spaces of constant zero sectional curvature) Jacobi fields are simply those fields linear in $t$.
- For Riemannian manifolds of constant negative sectional curvature $-k^2$, any Jacobi field is a linear combination of $\dot\gamma(t)$, $t\dot\gamma(t)$ and $\exp(\pm kt)e_i(t)$, where $i>1$.
- For Riemannian manifolds of constant positive sectional curvature $k^2$, any Jacobi field is a linear combination of $\dot\gamma(t)$, $t\dot\gamma(t)$, $\sin(kt)e_i(t)$ and $\cos(kt)e_i(t)$, where $i>1$.
- The restriction of a Killing vector field to a geodesic is a Jacobi field in any Riemannian manifold.

== See also ==
- Conjugate points
- Geodesic deviation equation
- Rauch comparison theorem
- N-Jacobi field
