= Rabinovich–Fabrikant equations =

System of ordinary differential equations

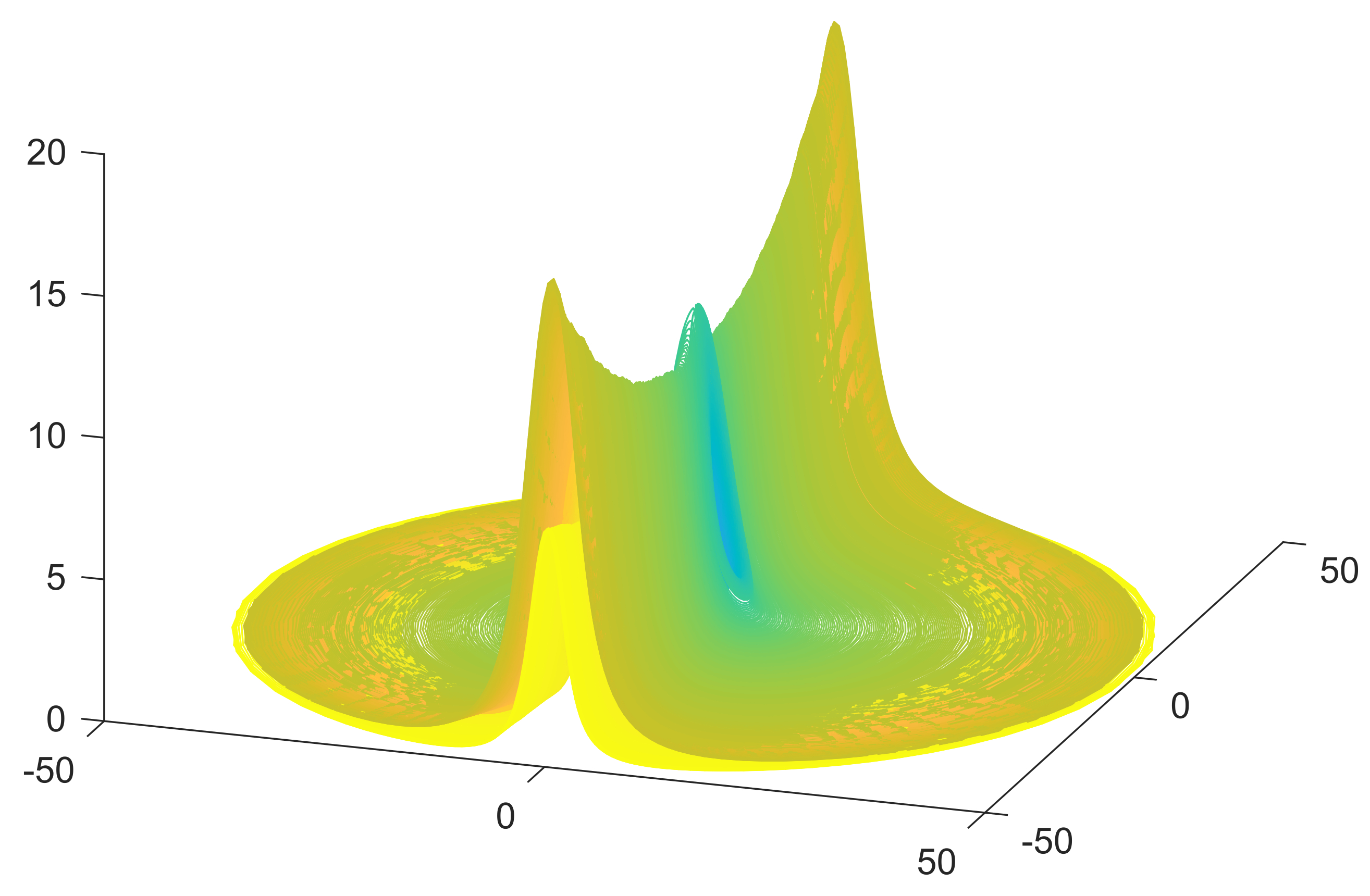
Trajectory of a solution with parameter values $\alpha=0.05$ and $\gamma=0.1$ and initial conditions $x_0=0.1$, $y_0=-0.1$, and $z_0=0.1$, using the default ODE solver in MATLAB. Colors vary from blue to yellow with time.

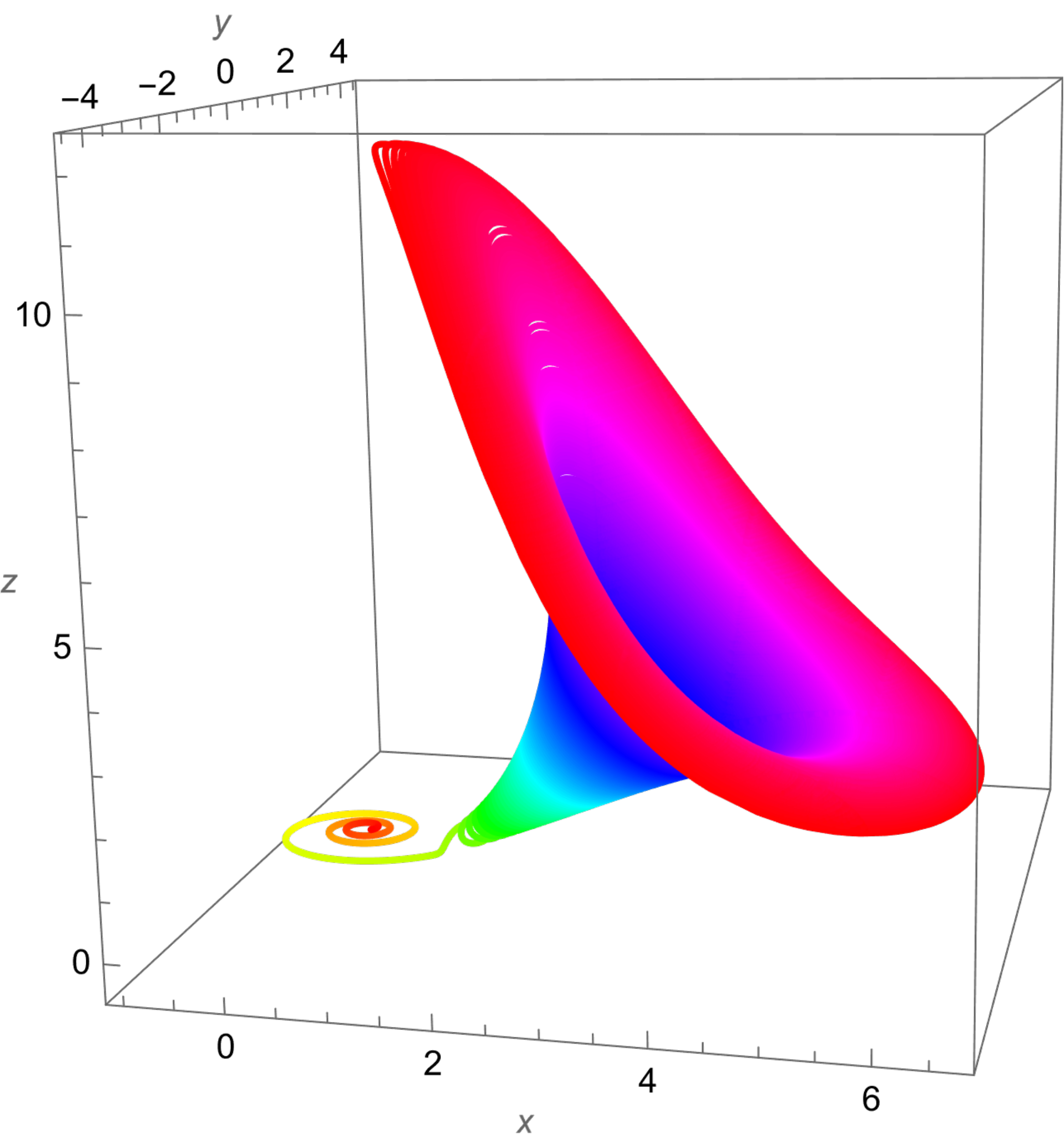
Trajectory of a solution with parameter values $\alpha=0.05$ and $\gamma=0.1$ and initial conditions $x_0=0.1$, $y_0=-0.1$, and $z_0=0.1$, using the default ODE solver in Mathematica. Colors vary from orange-red to magenta-red with time. Notice the drastic change in the solutions with respect to the solution obtained with MATLAB.

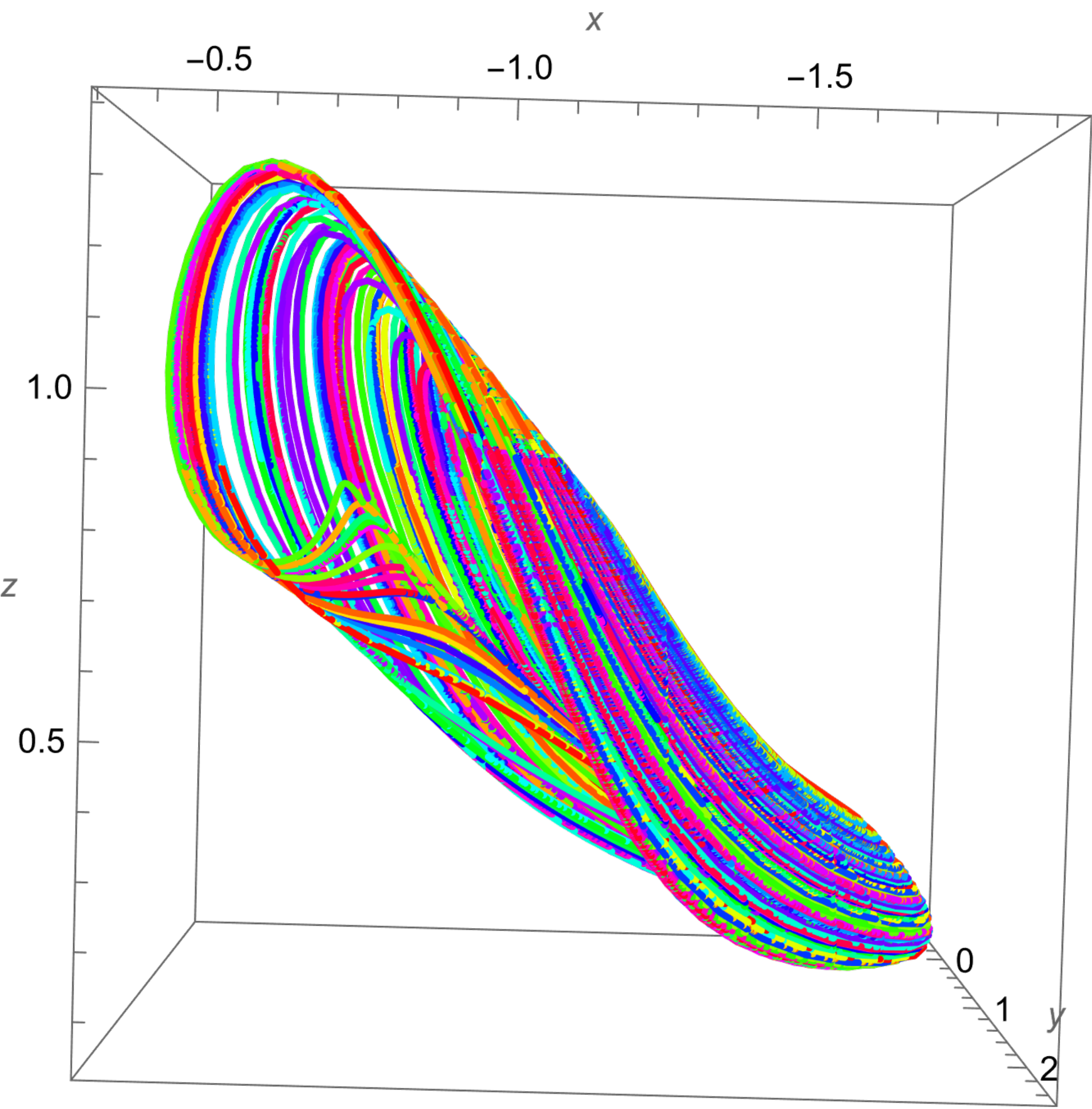
A chaotic attractor found with parameter values $\alpha=1.1$ and $\gamma=0.87$ and initial conditions $x_0=-1$, $y_0=-0$, and $z_0=0.5$, using the default ODE solver in Mathematica. Colors vary from orange-red to magenta-red with time. Notice that colors do not follow any order, reflecting the chaotic dynamics of the solution.

The Rabinovich–Fabrikant equations are a set of three coupled ordinary differential equations exhibiting chaotic behaviour for certain values of the parameters. They are named after Mikhail Rabinovich and Anatoly Fabrikant, who described them in 1979.

== System description ==
The equations are:

$$\dot{x} = y (z - 1 + x^2) + \gamma x \,$$
$$\dot{y} = x (3z + 1 - x^2) + \gamma y \,$$
$$\dot{z} = -2z (\alpha + xy), \,$$

where α, γ are constants that control the evolution of the system. For some values of α and γ, the system is chaotic, but for others it tends to a stable periodic orbit.

Danca and Chen note that the Rabinovich–Fabrikant system is difficult to analyse (due to the presence of quadratic and cubic terms) and that different attractors can be obtained for the same parameters by using different step sizes in the integration, see on the right an example of a solution obtained by two different solvers for the same parameter values and initial conditions. Also, recently, a hidden attractor was discovered in the Rabinovich–Fabrikant system.

=== Equilibrium points ===
Graph of the regions for which equilibrium points $\tilde{\mathbf{x}}_{1,2,3,4}$ exist.

The Rabinovich–Fabrikant system has five hyperbolic equilibrium points, one at the origin and four dependent on the system parameters α and γ:

$$\tilde{\mathbf{x}}_0 = (0,0,0)$$
$$\tilde{\mathbf{x}}_{1,2} = \left( \pm q_-, \mp \frac{\alpha}{q_-}, 1- \left(1-\frac{\gamma}{\alpha}\right)q_-^2 \right)$$
$$\tilde{\mathbf{x}}_{3,4} = \left( \pm q_+, \mp \frac{\alpha}{q_+}, 1- \left(1-\frac{\gamma}{\alpha}\right)q_+^2 \right)$$

where

$$q_{\pm} = \sqrt{ \frac{ 1 \pm \sqrt{ 1- \gamma \alpha \left( 1- \frac{3 \gamma}{4\alpha} \right) } }{2 \left(1- \frac{3\gamma}{4\alpha}\right) }}$$

These equilibrium points only exist for certain values of α and γ > 0.

=== γ = 0.87, α = 1.1 ===
An example of chaotic behaviour is obtained for γ = 0.87 and α = 1.1 with initial conditions of (−1, 0, 0.5), see trajectory on the right. The correlation dimension was found to be 2.19 ± 0.01. The Lyapunov exponents, λ are approximately 0.1981, 0, −0.6581 and the Kaplan–Yorke dimension, D_{KY} ≈ 2.3010

=== γ = 0.1 ===
Danca and Romera showed that for γ = 0.1, the system is chaotic for α = 0.98, but progresses on a stable limit cycle for α = 0.14.

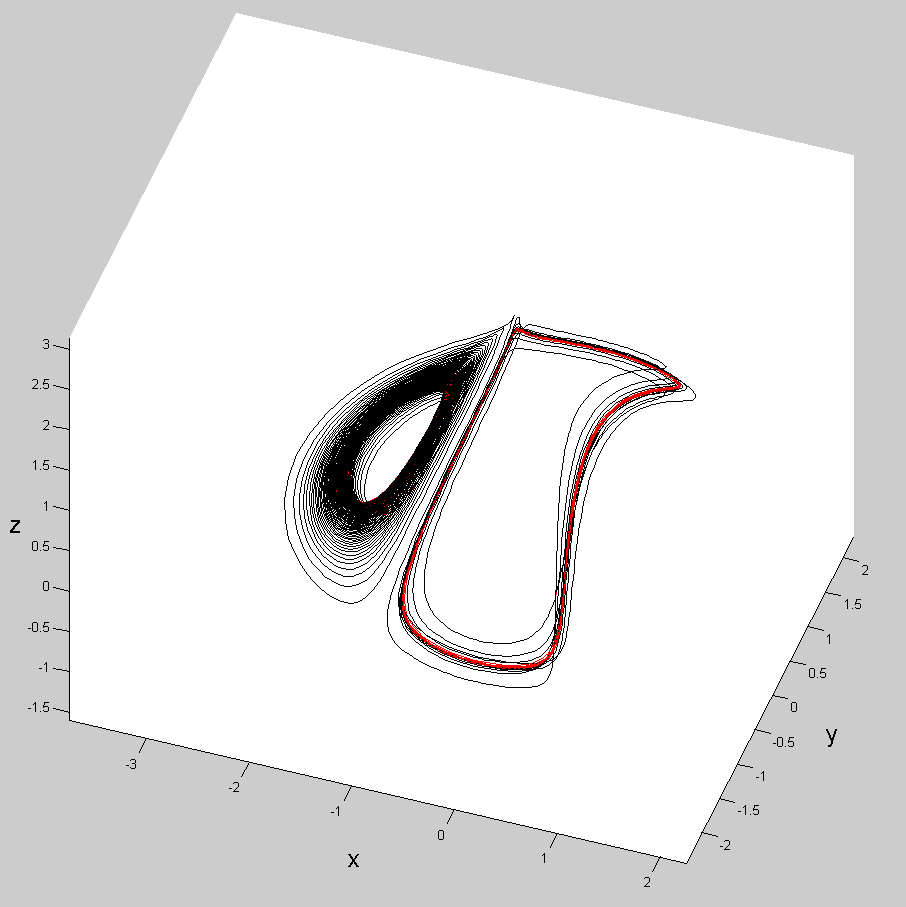
3D parametric plot of the solution of the Rabinovich-Fabrikant equations for α=0.14 and γ=0.1 (limit cycle is shown by the red curve)

== See also ==
- List of chaotic maps
