= Differential equation =

Type of functional equation (mathematics)

In mathematics, a differential equation is an equation that relates one or more unknown functions and their derivatives. In applications, the functions generally represent physical quantities, the derivatives represent their rates of change, and the differential equation defines a relationship between the two. Such relations are common in mathematical models and scientific laws; therefore, differential equations play a prominent role in many disciplines including engineering, physics, economics, and biology.

The study of differential equations consists mainly of the study of their solutions (the set of functions that satisfy each equation), and of the properties of their solutions. Only the simplest differential equations are solvable by explicit formulas; however, many properties of solutions of a given differential equation may be determined without computing them exactly.

Often when a closed-form expression for the solutions is not available, solutions may be approximated numerically using computers, and many numerical methods have been developed to determine solutions with a given degree of accuracy. The theory of dynamical systems analyzes the qualitative aspects of solutions, such as their average behavior over a long time interval.

== History ==
Differential equations came into existence with the invention of calculus by Isaac Newton and Gottfried Leibniz. In Chapter 2 of his 1671 work Methodus fluxionum et Serierum Infinitarum, Newton listed three kinds of differential equations:
$$\begin{align}
\frac {dy}{dx} &= f(x) \\[4pt]
\frac {dy}{dx} &= f(x, y) \\[4pt]
x_1 \frac {\partial y}{\partial x_1} &+ x_2 \frac {\partial y}{\partial x_2} = y
\end{align}$$
In all these cases, y is an unknown function of x (or of x_{1} and x_{2}), and f is a given function. He solved these examples and others using infinite series and discussed the non-uniqueness of solutions.

Jacob Bernoulli proposed the Bernoulli differential equation in 1695. This is an ordinary differential equation of the form
$$y'+ P(x)y = Q(x)y^n\,$$
for which the following year Leibniz obtained solutions by simplifying it.

Historically, the problem of a vibrating string such as that of a musical instrument was studied by Jean le Rond d'Alembert, Leonhard Euler, Daniel Bernoulli, and Joseph-Louis Lagrange. In 1746, d’Alembert discovered the one-dimensional wave equation, and within ten years Euler discovered the three-dimensional wave equation.

The Euler–Lagrange equation was developed in the 1750s by Euler and Lagrange in connection with their studies of the tautochrone problem. This is the problem of determining a curve on which a weighted particle will fall to a fixed point in a fixed amount of time, independent of the starting point. Lagrange solved this problem in 1755 and sent the solution to Euler. Both further developed Lagrange's method and applied it to mechanics, which led to the formulation of Lagrangian mechanics.

In 1822, Fourier published his work on heat flow in Théorie analytique de la chaleur (The Analytic Theory of Heat), in which he based his reasoning on Newton's law of cooling, namely, that the flow of heat between two adjacent molecules is proportional to the extremely small difference of their temperatures. Contained in this book was Fourier's proposal of his heat equation for conductive diffusion of heat. This partial differential equation is now a common part of mathematical physics curriculum.

== Example ==
In classical mechanics, the motion of a body is described by its position and velocity as the time value varies. Newton's laws allow these variables to be expressed dynamically (given the position, velocity, and various forces acting on the body) as a differential equation for the unknown position of the body as a function of time.

In some cases, this differential equation (called an equation of motion) may be solved explicitly.

An example of modeling a real-world problem using differential equations is the determination of the velocity of a ball falling through the air, considering only gravity and air resistance. The ball's acceleration towards the ground is the acceleration due to gravity minus the deceleration due to air resistance. Gravity is considered constant, and air resistance may be modeled as proportional to the ball's velocity. This means that the ball's acceleration, which is a derivative of its velocity, depends on the velocity (and the velocity depends on time). Finding the velocity as a function of time involves solving a differential equation and verifying its validity.

== Types ==
Differential equations can be classified several different ways. Besides describing the properties of the equation itself, these classes of differential equations can help inform the choice of approach to a solution. Commonly used distinctions include whether the equation is ordinary or partial, linear or non-linear, and homogeneous or heterogeneous. This list is far from exhaustive; there are many other properties and subclasses of differential equations which can be very useful in specific contexts.

=== Ordinary differential equations ===
An ordinary differential equation (ODE) is an equation containing an unknown function of one real or complex variable x, its derivatives, and some given functions of x. The unknown function is generally represented by a dependent variable (often denoted y), which, therefore, depends on x. Thus x is often called the independent variable of the equation. The term "ordinary" is used in contrast with the term partial differential equation, which may be with respect to more than one independent variable.

As, in general, the solutions of a differential equation cannot be expressed by a closed-form expression, numerical methods are commonly used for solving differential equations on a computer.

=== Partial differential equations ===
A partial differential equation (PDE) is a differential equation that contains unknown multivariable functions and their partial derivatives. PDEs are used to formulate problems involving functions of several variables, and are either solved in closed form, or using a relevant computer model.

PDEs can be used to describe a wide variety of phenomena in nature such as sound, heat, electrostatics, electrodynamics, fluid flow, elasticity, or quantum mechanics. These seemingly distinct physical phenomena can be formalized similarly in terms of PDEs. Just as ordinary differential equations often model one-dimensional dynamical systems, partial differential equations often model multidimensional systems. Stochastic partial differential equations generalize partial differential equations for modeling randomness.

=== Linear differential equations ===
Linear differential equations are differential equations that are linear in the unknown function and its derivatives. Their theory is well developed, and in many cases one may express their solutions in terms of integrals.

Many differential equations that are encountered in physics are linear, for example ODEs describing radioactive decay and PDEs for heat transfer by thermal diffusion. These lead to special functions, which may be defined as solutions of linear differential equations (see Holonomic function).

=== Nonlinear differential equations ===
A nonlinear differential equation is a differential equation that is not a linear equation in the unknown function and its derivatives (the linearity or non-linearity in the arguments of the function are not considered here). There are very few methods of solving nonlinear differential equations exactly; those that are known typically depend on the equation having particular symmetries. Nonlinear differential equations can exhibit very complicated behaviour over extended time intervals, characteristic of chaos. Even the fundamental questions of existence and uniqueness of solutions for nonlinear differential equations are hard problems and their resolution in special cases is considered to be a significant advance in the mathematical theory; for example, Navier–Stokes existence and smoothness. However, if the differential equation is a correctly formulated representation of a meaningful physical process, then one expects it to have a solution.

In some circumstances, nonlinear differential equations may be approximated by linear ones. These approximations are only valid under restricted conditions. For example, the harmonic oscillator equation is an approximation to the nonlinear pendulum equation that is valid for small amplitude oscillations. Similarly, when a fixed point or stationary solution of a nonlinear differential equation has been found, investigation of its stability leads to a linear differential equation.

=== Equation order and degree ===
The order of the differential equation is the highest order of derivative of the unknown function that appears in the differential equation. For example, an equation containing only first-order derivatives is a first-order differential equation, an equation containing the second-order derivative is a second-order differential equation, and so on.

When it is written as a polynomial equation in the unknown function and its derivatives, the degree of the differential equation is, depending on the context, the polynomial degree in the highest derivative of the unknown function, or its total degree in the unknown function and its derivatives. In particular, a linear differential equation has degree one for both meanings, but the non-linear differential equation $y'+y^2=0$ is of degree one for the first meaning but not for the second one.

Differential equations that describe natural phenomena usually have only first and second order derivatives in them, but there are some exceptions, such as the thin-film equation, which is a fourth order partial differential equation.

=== Homogeneous linear equations ===
A linear differential equation is homogeneous if each term in the equation includes either the dependent variable or one of its derivatives. If this is not the case, so that there is a term that does not include either the dependent variable itself or a derivative of it, the equation is inhomogeneous or heterogeneous. See the examples section below.

=== Examples ===
The first group of examples are ordinary differential equations, where u is an unknown function of x, and c and ω are constants that are assumed to be known. These examples illustrate the distinction between linear and nonlinear differential equations, and between homogeneous differential equations and inhomogeneous ones, defined above.

- Inhomogeneous first-order linear constant-coefficient ordinary differential equation:
  $$\frac{du}{dx} = cu+x^2.$$
- Homogeneous second-order linear ordinary differential equation:
  $$\frac{d^2u}{dx^2} - x\frac{du}{dx} + u = 0.$$
- Homogeneous second-order linear constant-coefficient ordinary differential equation describing the harmonic oscillator:
  $$\frac{d^2u}{dx^2} + \omega^2u = 0.$$
- First-order nonlinear ordinary differential equation:
  $$\frac{du}{dx} = u^2 + 4.$$
- Second-order nonlinear (due to sine function) ordinary differential equation describing the motion of a pendulum of length L:
  $$L\frac{d^2u}{dx^2} + g\sin u = 0.$$

The next group of examples are partial differential equations. The unknown function u depends on two variables x and t or x and y.

- Homogeneous first-order linear partial differential equation:
  $$\frac{\partial u}{\partial t} + t\frac{\partial u}{\partial x} = 0.$$
- Homogeneous second-order linear constant coefficient partial differential equation of elliptic type, the Laplace equation:
  $$\frac{\partial^2 u}{\partial x^2} + \frac{\partial^2 u}{\partial y^2} = 0.$$
- Third-order non-linear partial differential equation, the KdV equation:
  $$\frac{\partial u}{\partial t} = 6u\frac{\partial u}{\partial x} - \frac{\partial^3 u}{\partial x^3}.$$

== Initial conditions and boundary conditions ==
The general solution of a first-order ordinary differential equation includes a constant, which can be thought of as a constant of integration. Similarly, the general solution of a $n$th order ODE contains $n$ constants.

To determine the values of these constants, additional conditions must be provided. If the independent variable corresponds to time, this information takes the form of initial conditions. For example, for a second-order ODE describing the motion of a particle, the initial conditions would typically be the position and velocity of the particle at the initial time. The ODE and its initial conditions form what is known as an initial value problem.

For the case of a spatial independent variable, these conditions are generally known as boundary conditions. These are often specified at different values of the independent variable. Examples include the motion of a vibrating string that is fixed at two endpoints. In this case the ODE and boundary conditions lead to a boundary value problem.

More generally, the term initial conditions is normally used when the conditions are given at the same value of the independent variable, and the term boundary conditions is used when they are specified at different values of the independent variable. In either case, the number of initial or boundary conditions should match the order of the differential equation.

== Existence of solutions ==
For a given differential equation, the questions of whether solutions are unique or exist at all are notable subjects of interest.

For a first-order initial value problem, the Peano existence theorem gives one set of circumstances in which a solution exists. Given any point $(a, b)$ in the xy-plane, define some rectangular region $Z$, such that $Z = [l, m]\times[n, p]$ and $(a, b)$ is in the interior of $Z$. If we are given a differential equation $\frac{dy}{dx} = g(x, y)$ and the condition that $y = b$ when $x = a$, then there is locally a solution to this problem if $g(x, y)$ is continuous on $Z$. This solution exists on some interval with its center at $a$. The solution may not be unique. (See Ordinary differential equation for other results.)

However, this only helps us with first order initial value problems. Suppose we had a linear initial value problem of the nth order:
$$f_{n}(x)\frac{d^n y}{dx^n} + \cdots + f_{1}(x)\frac{d y}{dx} + f_{0}(x)y = g(x)$$
such that
$$\begin{align}
y(x_{0}) &= y_{0}, &
y'(x_{0}) &= y'_{0}, &
y''(x_{0}) &= y''_{0}, &
\ldots
\end{align}$$

For any nonzero $f_{n}(x)$, if $\{f_{0},f_{1},\ldots\}$ and $g$ are continuous on some interval containing $x_{0}$, $y$ exists and is unique.

== Related concepts ==
- A delay differential equation (DDE) is an equation for a function of a single variable, usually called time, in which the derivative of the function at a certain time is given in terms of the values of the function at earlier times.
- Integral equations may be viewed as the analog to differential equations where instead of the equation involving derivatives, the equation contains integrals.
- An integro-differential equation (IDE) is an equation that combines aspects of a differential equation and an integral equation.
- A stochastic differential equation (SDE) is an equation in which the unknown quantity is a stochastic process and the equation involves some known stochastic processes, for example, the Wiener process in the case of diffusion equations.
- A stochastic partial differential equation (SPDE) is an equation that generalizes SDEs to include space-time noise processes, with applications in quantum field theory and statistical mechanics.
- An ultrametric pseudo-differential equation is an equation which contains p-adic numbers in an ultrametric space. Mathematical models that involve ultrametric pseudo-differential equations use pseudo-differential operators instead of differential operators.
- A differential algebraic equation (DAE) is a differential equation comprising differential and algebraic terms, given in implicit form.

== Connection to difference equations ==
Differential equations are closely related to difference equations, in which the independent variable assumes only discrete values, and the equation relates the value of the unknown function at a point to its values at nearby points. Many numerical methods for differential equations, for example the Euler method, involve the approximation of the solution of a differential equation by the solution of a corresponding difference equation.

== Applications ==
The study of differential equations is a wide field in pure and applied mathematics, physics, and engineering. All of these disciplines are concerned with the properties of differential equations of various types. Pure mathematics focuses on the existence and uniqueness of solutions, while applied mathematics is concerned with finding solutions, either directly or approximately, and studying their behaviour. Differential equations play an important role in modeling virtually every physical, technical, or biological process, from celestial motion, to bridge design, to interactions between neurons. Differential equations such as those used to solve real-life problems may not have closed form solutions. Instead, solutions can be approximated using numerical methods.

Many fundamental laws of physics and chemistry can be formulated as differential equations. In biology and economics, differential equations are used to model the behavior of complex systems. The mathematical theory of differential equations first developed together with the sciences where the equations had originated and where the results found application. However, diverse problems, sometimes originating in quite distinct scientific fields, may give rise to identical differential equations. When this happens, mathematical theory behind the equations can be viewed as a unifying principle behind diverse phenomena. As an example, consider the propagation of light and sound in the atmosphere, and of waves on the surface of a pond. All of them may be described by the same second-order partial differential equation, the wave equation, which allows us to think of light and sound as forms of waves, much like familiar waves in the water. Conduction of heat, the theory of which was developed by Joseph Fourier, is governed by another second-order partial differential equation, the heat equation. It turns out that many diffusion processes, while seemingly different, are described by the same equation.

The number of differential equations that have received a name demonstrates the importance of the topic.

== Software ==
Some CAS software can solve differential equations. These are the commands used in the leading programs:

- Maple: dsolve
- Mathematica: DSolve[]
- Maxima: ode2(equation, y, x)
- SageMath: desolve()
- SymPy: sympy.solvers.ode.dsolve(equation)
- Xcas: desolve(y'=k*y,y)

== See also ==
- Exact differential equation
- Functional differential equation
- Initial condition
- Integral equations
- Numerical methods for ordinary differential equations
- Numerical methods for partial differential equations
- Picard–Lindelöf theorem on existence and uniqueness of solutions
- Recurrence relation, also known as 'difference equation'
- Abstract differential equation
- System of differential equations
