= Riccati equation =

Type of differential equation

In mathematics, a Riccati equation in the narrowest sense is any first-order ordinary differential equation that is quadratic in the unknown function. In other words, it is an equation of the form
$$y'(x) = q_0(x) + q_1(x) \, y(x) + q_2(x) \, y^2(x)$$
where $q_0(x) \neq 0$ and $q_2(x) \neq 0$. If $q_0(x) = 0$ the equation reduces to a Bernoulli equation, while if $q_2(x) = 0$ the equation becomes a first order linear ordinary differential equation.

The name of the equation goes back to a treatise from 1724 by Jacopo Riccati (1676–1754) though Johann Bernoulli was the first to publish an equation of this form (1694) and Jacob Bernoulli obtained a solution for a special case (1703).

The term Riccati equation is also used for matrix equations with an analogous quadratic term. These occur in both continuous-time (differential) and discrete-time (difference) linear-quadratic-Gaussian control. The steady-state (non-dynamic) version of these is referred to as the algebraic Riccati equation.

== Canonical form ==
Every Riccati equation can be brought into a canonical form in which the quadratic coefficient is unity. For a given $y' = q_0(x) + q_1(x)y + q_2(x)y^2$, wherever $q_2$ is non-zero and differentiable, we may substitute $v = yq_2$, and find

$$\begin{align}
v' &= (yq_2)' \\[4pt]
&= y'q_2 +yq_2' \\
&= \left(q_0+q_1 y + q_2 y^2\right) q_2 + v \frac{q_2'}{q_2} \\
&= q_0q_2  + \left(q_1+\frac{q_2'}{q_2}\right) v + v^2
\\
&=a(x) + b(x) v + v^2
\end{align}$$
with $a = q_0q_2$ and $b = q_1 + {q_2'}/{q_2}$.

== Conversion to a second order linear equation ==
The quadratic nonlinear ordinary differential equation (ODE) known as the Riccati equation can be converted to a second order linear ordinary differential equation. Starting from the canonical form $v' = a(x) + b(x) v + v^2$, define the function $u(x) = \exp\left(-\int v \, dx\right)$, so that $u' = -uv$. Then
$$\begin{align}
u''&= -u'v - v' u
\\ &= v^2 u - v' u
\\ &= v^2u - (a(x) + b(x) v + v^2) u
\\ &= - u a(x) - b(x) u v
\\ &= - u a(x) + b(x) u' .
\end{align}$$
Thus the solution $y(x)$ of a Riccati equation can be obtained from a solution $u(x)$ of the second order linear ODE
$$u'' - b(x) u' + a(x) u = 0$$
through
$$y = \frac{v}{q_2} = -\frac{u'}{q_2u} = -q_2^{-1} \left[\ln|u| \right]'.$$
If $u_1$ and $u_2$ are two linearly independent solutions of the linear equation, then the general solution of the Riccati equation is given by the formula:
$$y = -q_2^{-1} \left[\ln|c_1 u_1 + c_2 u_2| \right]'.$$
Only the ratio $c_1 : c_2$ matters, so this is a one-parameter family of solutions. The solution has a pole wherever $u = c_1 u_1 + c_2 u_2$ vanishes (and $q_2$ is regular), so in general it exists only on an interval between two such poles.

Conversely, a second order linear homogeneous ODE can be transformed into a Riccati equation by the substitution $y = -u'/u$. For example, the Bessel equation $x^2 u'' + x u' + (x^2-n^2) u = 0$ becomes
$$y' = y^2 - \frac{y}{x} + 1 - \frac{n^2}{x^2},$$
and the stationary Schrödinger equation $\psi'' = (V-E)\psi$ becomes $y' = V - E - y^2$ for $y = \psi'/\psi$.

== Complex analysis ==
In complex analysis, one considers first-order ODEs in the complex plane of the form
$$\frac{d w}{dz} = F(w,z) = \frac{P(w,z)}{Q(w,z)},$$
where $P$ and $Q$ are polynomials in $w$ whose coefficients are locally analytic functions of $z \in \mathbb{C}$, i.e., $F$ is a complex rational function of $w$. Such an equation has the Painlevé property if all its solutions are free of movable branch points, that is, of singularities other than poles whose location depends on the initial conditions. The only equations of this form with the Painlevé property are the Riccati equations
$$\frac{dw(z)}{dz} = A_0 (z) + A_1 (z) w + A_2(z) w^2.$$
A related result is Malmquist's theorem: if $F$ is rational in both $w$ and $z$ and the equation has a transcendental meromorphic solution in the whole plane, then it is a Riccati equation.

=== Application to the Schwarzian equation ===
An important application of the Riccati equation is to the 3rd order Schwarzian differential equation
$$S(w) := \left(\frac{w''}{w'}\right)' - \frac{1}{2}\left(\frac{w''}{w'}\right)^2 = f$$
which occurs in the theory of conformal mapping and univalent functions. In this case the ODEs are in the complex domain and differentiation is with respect to a complex variable.

The Schwarzian derivative S(w) has the remarkable property that it is invariant under Möbius transformations, i.e. $S\bigl(\tfrac{aw+b}{cw+d}\bigr) = S(w)$ whenever $ad-bc$ is non-zero.

The function $y = \tfrac{w''}{w'}$ satisfies the Riccati equation
$$y' = \frac{1}{2}y^2 + f,$$
that is, $q_0 = f$, $q_1 = 0$, $q_2 = \tfrac12$. By the above $y = -2 \tfrac{u'}{u}$ where u is a solution of the linear ODE
$$u'' + \frac{1}{2}fu = 0.$$
Since $\tfrac{w''}{w'} = -2\tfrac{u'}{u},$ integration gives $w' = \tfrac{C}{u^2}$ for some constant C. On the other hand any other independent solution U of the linear ODE has constant non-zero Wronskian $U'u - Uu'$ which can be taken to be C after scaling. Thus
$$w' = \frac{U'u-Uu'}{u^2} = \left(\frac{U}{u}\right)'$$
so that the Schwarzian equation has the solution $w = \tfrac{U}{u}.$ By the Möbius invariance of S(w), the general solution is the Möbius transform $\tfrac{\alpha U + \beta u}{\gamma U + \delta u}$ of this solution.

== Obtaining solutions by quadrature ==
The correspondence between Riccati equations and second-order linear ODEs has other consequences. For example, if one solution of a 2nd order ODE is known, then it is known that another solution can be obtained by quadrature, i.e., a simple integration. The same holds true for the Riccati equation. If one particular solution y_{1} is known, for instance found by inspection or by a polynomial or rational ansatz, then the substitution
$$y = y_1 + \frac{1}{z}$$
reduces the problem to a linear equation. To see this, first write $y = y_1 + s$. Since
$$y_1' = q_0 + q_1 \, y_1 + q_2 \, y_1^2,$$
inserting this into the Riccati equation yields
$$s' = q_1 \, s + 2 \, q_2 \, y_1 \, s + q_2 \, s^2$$
or
$$s' - (q_1 + 2 \, q_2 \, y_1) \, s = q_2 \, s^2,$$
which is a Bernoulli equation. Its standard substitution is $z = 1/s$, which gives the linear equation
$$z' + (q_1 + 2 \, q_2 \, y_1) \, z = -q_2 .$$
The general solution of the Riccati equation is then
$$y = y_1 + \frac{1}{z}$$
where z is the general solution of this linear equation. The particular solution y_{1} itself corresponds to $z = \infty$.

=== Example ===
The equation $y' = 1 - y^2$ has the particular solution $y_1 = 1$. Here $q_1 = 0$ and $q_2 = -1$, so the linear equation is $z' - 2z = 1$, with general solution $z = C e^{2x} - \tfrac12$. Hence
$$y = 1 + \frac{2}{K e^{2x} - 1} = \frac{K e^{2x} + 1}{K e^{2x} - 1}, \qquad K = 2C,$$
which for $K<0$ is a hyperbolic tangent, $y = \tanh(x - a)$ with $K = -e^{-2a}$, and for $K>0$ a hyperbolic cotangent. The constant solution $y=-1$ corresponds to $K=0$.

== Further properties ==
Since the general solution $y = -q_2^{-1}[\ln|c_1u_1+c_2u_2|]'$ is a fractional linear (Möbius) function of the constant $c_1/c_2$, the cross-ratio of any four solutions of a Riccati equation is constant. This gives a nonlinear superposition principle: given three solutions, every other solution is obtained algebraically.

Via the substitution $y = -u'/u$, Riccati equations are linked to the Sturm–Liouville and Schrödinger equations, and thereby to Darboux transformations.

== See also ==
- Linear-quadratic regulator
