= Bernoulli differential equation =

Type of ordinary differential equation

In mathematics, an ordinary differential equation is called a Bernoulli differential equation if it is of the form

$$y'+ P(x)y = Q(x)y^n,$$

where $n$ is a real number. Some authors allow any real $n$, whereas others require that $n$ not be 0 or 1 as they cause the equation to become linear. The equation was first discussed in a work of 1695 by Jacob Bernoulli, after whom it is named. The earliest solution, however, was offered by Gottfried Leibniz, who published his result in the same year and whose method is the one still used today.

Bernoulli equations are special because they are nonlinear differential equations with known exact solutions. A notable special case of the Bernoulli equation is the logistic differential equation.

== Transformation to a linear differential equation ==
When $n = 0$, the differential equation is linear. When $n = 1$, it is separable. In these cases, standard techniques for solving equations of those forms can be applied. For $n \neq 0$ and $n \neq 1$, the substitution $u = y^{1-n}$ reduces any Bernoulli equation to a linear differential equation, as shown:

$$\frac{du}{dx} - (n-1)P(x)u = - (n-1)Q(x).$$

For example, in the case $n = 2$, making the substitution $u=y^{-1}$ in the differential equation $\frac{dy}{dx} + \frac{1}{x}y=xy^2$ produces the equation $\frac{du}{dx} -\frac{1}{x}u=-x$, which is a linear differential equation.

== Solution ==
Let $x_0 \in (a, b)$ and

$$\begin{cases}
z: (a,b) \rightarrow (0, \infty), &\text{if } \alpha\in \mathbb{R} \smallsetminus \{1,2\},\\[4pt]
z: (a,b) \rightarrow \mathbb{R}\smallsetminus\{0\}, & \text{if } \alpha = 2, \end{cases}$$

be a solution of the linear differential equation

$$z'(x)=(1-\alpha)P(x)z(x) + (1-\alpha)Q(x).$$

Then we have that $y(x) := [z(x)]^{1/(1-\alpha)}$ is a solution of

$$y'(x)= P(x)y(x) + Q(x)y^\alpha(x)\ ,\ y(x_0) = y_0 := [z(x_0)]^{1/(1-\alpha)}.$$

And for every such differential equation, for all $\alpha>0$ we have $y\equiv 0$ as solution for $y_0=0$.

== Example ==
Consider the Bernoulli equation

$$y' - \frac{2y}{x} = -x^2y^2$$

(in this case, more specifically a Riccati equation). The constant function $y=0$ is a solution. Division by $y^2$ yields

$$y'y^{-2} - \frac2x y^{-1} = -x^2$$

Changing variables gives the equations

$$\begin{align}
u = \frac{1}{y} \; & , ~ u' = \frac{-y'}{y^2} \\[5pt]
-u' - \frac{2}{x}u &= - x^2 \\[5pt]
u' + \frac{2}{x}u &= x^2
\end{align}$$

which can be solved using the integrating factor

$$M(x)= e^{2\int \frac{1}{x}\,dx} = e^{2\ln x} = x^2.$$

Multiplying by $M(x)$,

$$u'x^2 + 2xu = x^4.$$

The left side can be represented as the derivative of $ux^2$ by reversing the product rule. Applying the chain rule and integrating both sides with respect to $x$ results in the equations

$$\begin{align}
\int \left(ux^2\right)' dx &= \int x^4\,dx \\[5pt]
ux^2 &= \frac{1}{5}x^5 + C \\[5pt]
\frac{1}{y}x^2 &= \frac{1}{5}x^5 + C
\end{align}$$

The solution for $y$ is

$$y = \frac{x^2}{\frac{1}{5}x^5 + C}.$$
