= Stable manifold theorem =

Result in dynamical systems theory

In mathematics, especially in the study of dynamical systems and differential equations, the stable manifold theorem is an important result about the structure of the set of orbits approaching a given hyperbolic fixed point. It roughly states that the existence of a local diffeomorphism near a fixed point implies the existence of a local stable center manifold containing that fixed point. This manifold has dimension equal to the number of eigenvalues of the Jacobian matrix of the fixed point that are less than 1.

== Stable manifold theorem ==
Let

$$f: U \subset \mathbb{R}^n \to \mathbb{R}^n$$

be a smooth map with hyperbolic fixed point at $p$. We denote by $W^{s}(p)$ the stable set and by $W^{u}(p)$ the unstable set of $p$.

The theorem states that

- $W^{s}(p)$ is a smooth manifold and its tangent space has the same dimension as the stable space of the linearization of $f$ at $p$.
- $W^{u}(p)$ is a smooth manifold and its tangent space has the same dimension as the unstable space of the linearization of $f$ at $p$.

Accordingly $W^{s}(p)$ is a stable manifold and $W^{u}(p)$ is an unstable manifold.

== See also ==
- Center manifold theorem
- Lyapunov exponent

== Notes ==
1. Shub, Michael (1987). Global Stability of Dynamical Systems. Springer. pp. 65–66.
2. Pesin, Ya B (1977). "Characteristic Lyapunov Exponents and Smooth Ergodic Theory". Russian Mathematical Surveys. 32 (4): 55–114. Bibcode:1977RuMaS..32...55P. doi:10.1070/RM1977v032n04ABEH001639. S2CID 250877457.
3. Ruelle, David (1979). "Ergodic theory of differentiable dynamical systems". Publications Mathématiques de l'IHÉS. 50: 27–58. doi:10.1007/bf02684768. S2CID 56389695.
4. Teschl, Gerald (2012). Ordinary Differential Equations and Dynamical Systems. Providence: American Mathematical Society. ISBN 978-0-8218-8328-0.
