= Normally hyperbolic invariant manifold =

A normally hyperbolic invariant manifold (NHIM) is a natural generalization of a hyperbolic fixed point and a hyperbolic set. The difference can be described heuristically as follows: For a manifold $\Lambda$ to be normally hyperbolic we are allowed to assume that the dynamics of $\Lambda$ itself is neutral compared with the dynamics nearby, which is not allowed for a hyperbolic set. NHIMs were introduced by Neil Fenichel in 1972. In this and subsequent papers, Fenichel proves that NHIMs possess stable and unstable manifolds and more importantly, NHIMs and their stable and unstable manifolds persist under small perturbations. Thus, in problems involving perturbation theory, invariant manifolds exist with certain hyperbolicity properties, which can in turn be used to obtain qualitative information about a dynamical system.

== Definition ==
Let M be a compact smooth manifold, f: M → M a diffeomorphism, and Df: TM → TM the differential of f. An f-invariant submanifold Λ of M is said to be a normally hyperbolic invariant manifold if the restriction to Λ of the tangent bundle of M admits a splitting into a sum of three Df-invariant subbundles, one being the tangent bundle of $\Lambda$, the others being the stable bundle and the unstable bundle and denoted E^{s} and E^{u}, respectively. With respect to some Riemannian metric on M, the restriction of Df to E^{s} must be a contraction and the restriction of Df to E^{u} must be an expansion, and must be relatively neutral on $T\Lambda$. Thus, there exist constants $0 < \lambda < \mu^{-1} < 1$ and c > 0 such that

$$T_\Lambda M = T\Lambda\oplus E^s\oplus E^u$$

$$(Df)_x E^s_x = E^s_{f(x)}\text{ and }(Df)_x E^u_x = E^u_{f(x)} \text{ for all }x\in \Lambda,$$

$$\|Df^nv\| \le c\lambda^n\|v\|\text{ for all }v\in E^s\text{ and }n> 0,$$

$$\|Df^{-n}v\| \le c\lambda^n \|v\|\text{ for all }v\in E^u\text{ and }n>0,$$

and

$$\|Df^n v\| \le c\mu^{|n|} \|v\|\text{ for all }v\in T\Lambda\text{ and }n \in \mathbb{Z}.$$

== See also ==
- Stable manifold
- Center manifold
- Hyperbolic fixed point
- Hyperbolic set
- Hyperbolic Lagrangian coherent structures
