= Hyperbolic structure =

Hyperbolic structure may refer to:

- Hyperboloid structure
- Hyperbolic set
