= Inertial manifold =

In mathematics, inertial manifolds are concerned with the long term behavior of the solutions of dissipative dynamical systems. Inertial manifolds are finite-dimensional, smooth, invariant manifolds that contain the global attractor and attract all solutions exponentially quickly. Since an inertial manifold is finite-dimensional even if the original system is infinite-dimensional, and because most of the dynamics for the system takes place on the inertial manifold, studying the dynamics on an inertial manifold produces a considerable simplification in the study of the dynamics of the original system.

In many physical applications, inertial manifolds express an interaction law between the small and large wavelength structures. Some say that the small wavelengths are enslaved by the large (e.g. synergetics). Inertial manifolds may also appear as slow manifolds common in meteorology, or as the center manifold in any bifurcation. Computationally, numerical schemes for partial differential equations seek to capture the long term dynamics and so such numerical schemes form an approximate inertial manifold.

== Introductory Example ==
Consider the dynamical system in just two variables $p(t)$ and $q(t)$ and with parameter $a$:

$$\frac{dp}{dt}=ap-pq\,,\qquad \frac{dq}{dt}=-q+p^2-2q^2.$$

- It possesses the one dimensional inertial manifold $\mathcal M$ of $q=p^2/(1+2a)$ (a parabola).
- This manifold is invariant under the dynamics because on the manifold $\mathcal M$

$\frac{dq}{dt} =\frac{d}{dt}\frac{p^2}{1+2a} =\frac{2p\frac{dp}{dt}}{1+2a} =\frac{2ap^2}{1+2a}-\frac{2p^4}{(1+2a)^2}$ which is the same as
$-q+p^2-2q^2 =-\frac{p^2}{1+2a}+p^2-2\left(\frac{p^2}{1+2a}\right)^2 =\frac{2ap^2}{1+2a}-\frac{2p^4}{(1+2a)^2}.$

- The manifold $\mathcal M$ attracts all trajectories in some finite domain around the origin because near the origin $\frac{dq}{dt}\approx -q$ (although the strict definition below requires attraction from all initial conditions).

Hence the long term behavior of the original two dimensional dynamical system is given by the 'simpler' one dimensional dynamics on the inertial manifold $\mathcal M$, namely $\frac{dp}{dt}=ap-\frac1{1+2a}p^3$.

== Definition ==
Let $u(t)$ denote a solution of a dynamical system. The solution $u(t)$ may be an evolving vector in $H=\mathbb R^n$ or may be an evolving function in an infinite-dimensional Banach space $H$.

In many cases of interest the evolution of $u(t)$ is determined as the solution of a differential equation in $H$, say ${du}/{dt}=F(u(t))$ with initial value $u(0)=u_0$. In any case, we assume the solution of the dynamical system can be written in terms of a semigroup operator, or state transition matrix, $S:H\to H$ such that $u(t)=S(t)u_0$ for all times $t\geq0$ and all initial values $u_0$. In some situations we might consider only discrete values of time as in the dynamics of a map.

An inertial manifold for a dynamical semigroup $S(t)$ is a smooth manifold $\mathcal M$ such that

1. $\mathcal M$ is of finite dimension,
2. $S(t)\mathcal M\subset\mathcal M$ for all times $t\geq0$,
3. $\mathcal M$ attracts all solutions exponentially quickly, that is, for every initial value $u_0\in H$ there exist constants $c_j>0$ such that $\text{dist}(S(t)u_0,\mathcal M)\leq c_1e^{-c_2t}$.

The restriction of the differential equation $du/dt=F(u)$ to the inertial manifold $\mathcal M$ is therefore a well defined finite-dimensional system called the inertial system. Subtly, there is a difference between a manifold being attractive, and solutions on the manifold being attractive. Nonetheless, under appropriate conditions the inertial system possesses so-called asymptotic completeness: that is, every solution of the differential equation has a companion solution lying in $\mathcal M$ and producing the same behavior for large time; in mathematics, for all $u_0$ there exists $v_0\in\mathcal M$ and possibly a time shift $\tau\geq0$ such that $\text{dist}(S(t)u_0,S(t+\tau)v_0)\to0$ as $t\to\infty$.

Researchers in the 2000s generalized such inertial manifolds to time dependent (nonautonomous) and/or stochastic dynamical systems (e.g.)

== Existence ==
Existence results that have been proved address inertial manifolds that are expressible as a graph. The governing differential equation is rewritten more specifically in the form $du/dt+Au+f(u)=0$ for unbounded self-adjoint closed operator $A$ with domain $D(A)\subset H$, and nonlinear operator $f:D(A)\to H$. Typically, elementary spectral theory gives an orthonormal basis of $H$ consisting of eigenvectors $v_j$: $Av_j=\lambda_jv_j$, $j=1,2,\ldots$, for ordered eigenvalues $0<\lambda_1\leq \lambda_2\leq\cdots$.

For some given number $m$ of modes, $P$ denotes the projection of $H$ onto the space spanned by $v_1,\ldots,v_m$, and $Q=I-P$ denotes the orthogonal projection onto the space spanned by $v_{m+1},v_{m+2},\ldots$. We look for an inertial manifold expressed as the graph $\Phi:PH\to QH$. For this graph to exist the most restrictive requirement is the spectral gap condition $\lambda_{m+1}-\lambda_m \geq c(\sqrt{\lambda_{m+1}}+\sqrt{\lambda_m})$ where the constant $c$ depends upon the system. This spectral gap condition requires that the spectrum of $A$ must contain large gaps to be guaranteed of existence.

== Approximate inertial manifolds ==
Several methods are proposed to construct approximations to inertial manifolds, including the so-called intrinsic low-dimensional manifolds.

The most popular way to approximate follows from the existence of a graph. Define the $m$ slow variables $p(t)=Pu(t)$, and the 'infinite' fast variables $q(t)=Qu(t)$. Then project the differential equation $du/dt+Au+f(u)=0$ onto both $PH$ and $QH$ to obtain the coupled system $dp/dt+Ap+Pf(p+q)=0$ and $dq/dt+Aq+Qf(p+q)=0$.

For trajectories on the graph of an inertial manifold $M$, the fast variable $q(t)=\Phi(p(t))$. Differentiating and using the coupled system form gives the differential equation for the graph:

$$-\frac{d\Phi}{dp}\left[Ap+Pf(p+\Phi(p))\right]
+A\Phi(p)+Qf(p+\Phi(p))=0.$$

This differential equation is typically solved approximately in an asymptotic expansion in 'small' $p$ to give an invariant manifold model, or a nonlinear Galerkin method, both of which use a global basis whereas the so-called holistic discretisation uses a local basis. Such approaches to approximation of inertial manifolds are very closely related to approximating center manifolds for which a web service exists to construct approximations for systems input by a user.

== See also ==
- Wandering set
