= Stable set =

Stable set may refer to:

- Independent set (graph theory) in graph theory, a set of vertices no two of which are adjacent
- Invariant set, said to be "stable" under a mapping or transformation
- Stable manifold or stable set, in dynamical systems, the set of points leading up to an attractor
- Von Neumann-Morgenstern solution or stable set, in cooperative games, a set of alternatives satisfying the internal and external stability conditions
