= Invariant manifold =

Topological manifold that is invariant under the action of dynamical system

In dynamical systems, a branch of mathematics, an invariant manifold is a topological manifold that is invariant under the action of the dynamical system. Examples include the slow manifold, center manifold, stable manifold, unstable manifold, subcenter manifold and inertial manifold.

Typically, although by no means always, invariant manifolds are constructed as a 'perturbation' of an invariant subspace about an equilibrium. In dissipative systems, an invariant manifold based upon the gravest, longest lasting modes forms an effective low-dimensional, reduced, model of the dynamics.

== Definition ==
Consider the differential equation $dx/dt = f(x),\ x \in \mathbb R^n,$ with flow $x(t)=\phi_t(x_0)$ being the solution of the differential equation with $x(0)=x_0$. A set $S \subset \mathbb R^n$ is called an invariant set for the differential equation if, for each $x_0 \in S$, the solution $t \mapsto \phi_t(x_0)$, defined on its maximal interval of existence, has its image in $S$. Alternatively, the orbit passing through each $x_0 \in S$ lies in $S$. In addition, $S$ is called an invariant manifold if $S$ is a manifold.

== Examples ==
=== Simple 2D dynamical system ===
For any fixed parameter $a$, consider the variables $x(t),y(t)$ governed by the pair of coupled differential equations

$$\frac{\mathrm dx}{\mathrm dt}=ax-xy\quad\text{and}\quad \frac{\mathrm dy}{\mathrm dt}=-y+x^2-2y^2.$$

The origin is an equilibrium. This system has two invariant manifolds of interest through the origin.

- The vertical line $x=0$ is invariant as when $x=0$ the $x$-equation becomes $\tfrac{\mathrm dx}{\mathrm dt}=0$ which ensures $x$ remains zero. This invariant manifold, $x=0$, is a stable manifold of the origin (when $a\geq0$) as all initial conditions $x(0)=0,\ y(0)>-1/2$ lead to solutions asymptotically approaching the origin.
- The parabola $y=x^2/(1+2a)$ is invariant for all parameter $a$. One can see this invariance by considering the time derivative $\tfrac{\mathrm d}{\mathrm dt}\left(y-\tfrac{x^2}{1+2a}\right)$ and finding it is zero on $y=\tfrac{x^2}{1+2a}$ as required for an invariant manifold. For $a>0$ this parabola is the unstable manifold of the origin. For $a=0$ this parabola is a center manifold, more precisely a slow manifold, of the origin.
- For $a<0$ there is only an invariant stable manifold about the origin, the stable manifold including all $(x,y),\ y>-1/2$.

== Invariant manifolds in non-autonomous dynamical systems ==
A differential equation

$$\frac{\mathrm dx}{\mathrm dt} = f(x,t),\ x \in \mathbb R^n,\ t \in \mathbb R,$$

represents a non-autonomous dynamical system, whose solutions are of the form $x(t;t_0,x_0)=\phi^t_{t_0}(x_0)$ with $x(t_0;t_0,x_0)=x_0$. In the extended phase space $\mathbb R^n \times \mathbb R$ of such a system, any initial surface $M_0\subset \mathbb R^n$ generates an invariant manifold

$${\mathcal M}=\cup_{t\in \mathbb R}\phi^t_{t_0}(M_0).$$

A fundamental question is then how one can locate, out of this large family of invariant manifolds, the ones that have the highest influence on the overall system dynamics. These most influential invariant manifolds in the extended phase space of a non-autonomous dynamical systems are known as Lagrangian Coherent Structures.

== See also ==
- Hyperbolic set
- Lagrangian coherent structure
- Spectral submanifold
