= Hyperbolic point =

In mathematics, a hyperbolic point is a certain kind of point, one of:

- A point in a hyperbolic geometry
- A point of negative Gaussian curvature on a smooth surface
- A hyperbolic equilibrium point of a dynamical system
