= Center manifold =

Mathematical concept

In the mathematics of evolving systems, the concept of a center manifold was originally developed to determine stability of degenerate equilibria. Subsequently, the concept of center manifolds was realised to be fundamental to mathematical modelling.

Center manifolds play an important role in bifurcation theory because interesting behavior takes place on the center manifold and in multiscale mathematics because the long time dynamics of the micro-scale often are attracted to a relatively simple center manifold involving the coarse scale variables.

== Informal description ==
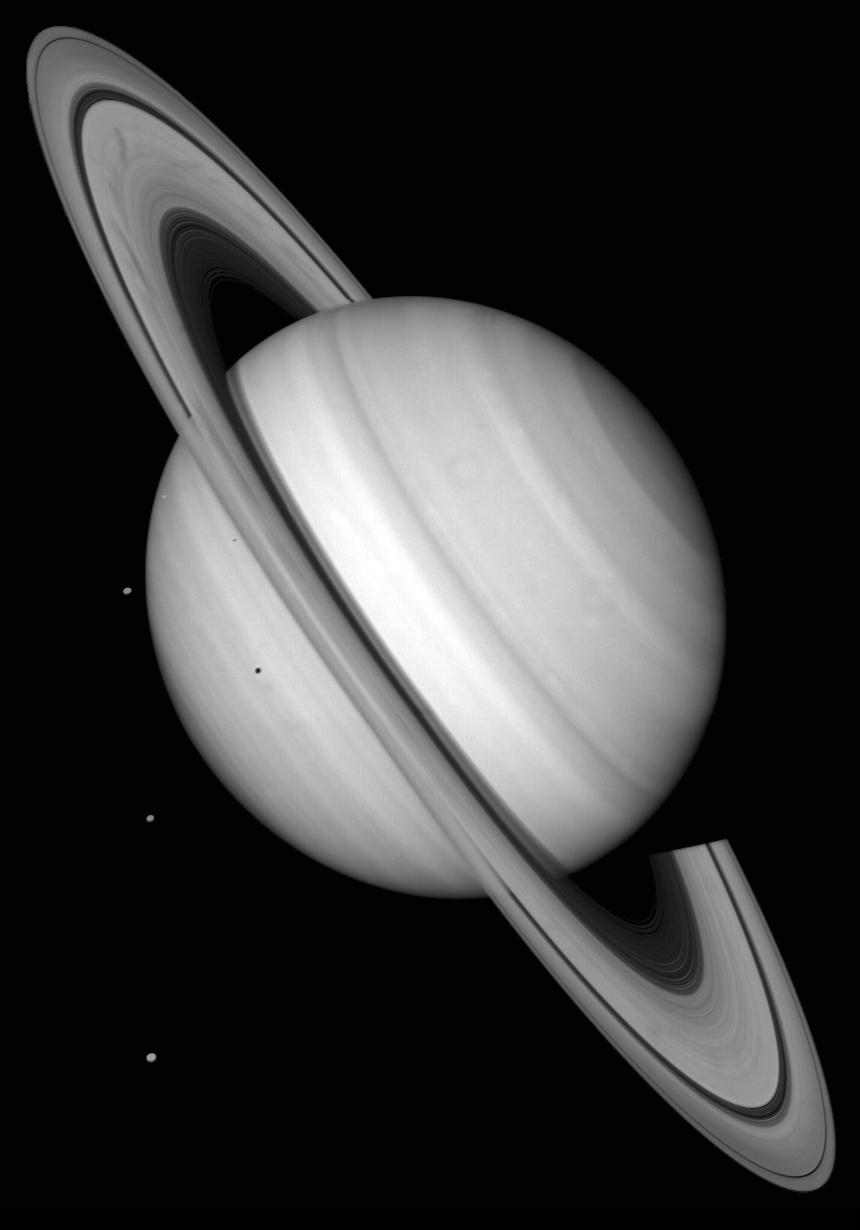
Saturn's rings sit in the center manifold defined by tidal forces.

Saturn's rings capture much of center-manifold geometry. Dust particles in the rings are subject to tidal forces, which act characteristically to "compress and stretch". The forces compress particle orbits into the rings, stretch particles along the rings, and ignore small shifts in ring radius. The compressing direction defines the stable manifold, the stretching direction defining the unstable manifold, and the neutral direction is the center manifold.

While geometrically accurate, one major difference distinguishes Saturn's rings from a physical center manifold. Like most dynamical systems, particles in the rings are governed by second-order laws. Understanding trajectories requires modeling position and a velocity/momentum variable, to give a tangent manifold structure called phase space. Physically speaking, the stable, unstable and neutral manifolds of Saturn's ring system do not divide up the coordinate space for a particle's position; they analogously divide up phase space instead.

The center manifold typically behaves as an extended collection of saddle points. Some position-velocity pairs are driven towards the center manifold, while others are flung away from it. Small perturbations that generally push them about randomly, and often push them out of the center manifold. There are, however, dramatic counterexamples to instability at the center manifold, called Lagrangian coherent structures. The entire unforced rigid body dynamics of a ball is a center manifold.

A much more sophisticated example is the Anosov flow on tangent bundles of Riemann surfaces. In that case, the tangent space splits very explicitly and precisely into three parts: the unstable and stable bundles, with the neutral manifold wedged between.

== Definition ==
Center (red) and unstable (green) manifolds of saddle-node equilibrium point of the system $\dot x=x^2,$ $\dot y=y$.

Randomly selected points of the 2D phase space converge exponentially to a 1D center manifold on which dynamics are slow (non exponential). Studying dynamics of the center manifold determines the stability of the non-hyperbolic fixed point at the origin.

The center manifold of a dynamical system is based upon an equilibrium point of that system. A center manifold of the equilibrium then consists of those nearby orbits that neither decay nor grow exponentially quickly.

Mathematically, the first step when studying equilibrium points of dynamical systems is to linearize the system, and then compute its eigenvalues and eigenvectors. The eigenvectors (and generalized eigenvectors if they occur) corresponding to eigenvalues with negative real part form a basis for the stable eigenspace. The (generalized) eigenvectors corresponding to eigenvalues with positive real part form the unstable eigenspace.

Algebraically, let
$$\frac{d\mathbf{x}}{dt}=\mathbf{f}(\mathbf{x})\approx(\mathcal{D}\mathbf{f})(\mathbf{x}^*)\mathbf{x}$$
be a dynamical system, linearized about equilibrium point x^{*}.

The Jacobian matrix (Df)(x^{*}) defines three main subspaces:

- the center subspace, spanned by generalized eigenvectors whose eigenvalues $\lambda$ satisfy $\operatorname{Re}\lambda=0$ (more generally, $|\operatorname{Re}\lambda|\leq\alpha$);
- the stable subspace, spanned by generalized eigenvectors whose eigenvalues $\lambda$ satisfy $\operatorname{Re}\lambda<0$ (more generally, $\operatorname{Re}\lambda\leq-\beta<-r\alpha$);
- the unstable subspace, spanned by the generalized eigenvectors whose eigenvalues $\lambda$ satisfy $\operatorname{Re}\lambda>0$ (more generally, $\operatorname{Re}\lambda\geq\beta>r\alpha$).

Depending upon the application, other invariant subspaces of the linearized equation may be of interest, including center-stable, center-unstable, sub-center, slow, and fast subspaces.

If the equilibrium point is hyperbolic (that is, all eigenvalues of the linearization have nonzero real part), then the Hartman-Grobman theorem guarantees that these eigenvalues and eigenvectors completely characterise the system's dynamics near the equilibrium. However, if the equilibrium has eigenvalues whose real part is zero, then the corresponding (generalized) eigenvectors form the center eigenspace. Going beyond the linearization, when we account for perturbations by nonlinearity or forcing in the dynamical system, the center eigenspace deforms to the nearby center manifold.

If the eigenvalues are precisely zero (as they are for the ball), rather than just real-part being zero, then the corresponding eigenspace more specifically gives rise to a slow manifold. The behavior on the center (slow) manifold is generally not determined by the linearization and thus may be difficult to construct.

Analogously, nonlinearity or forcing in the system perturbs the stable and unstable eigenspaces to a nearby stable manifold and nearby unstable manifold. These three types of manifolds are three cases of an invariant manifold.

Corresponding to the linearized system, the nonlinear system has invariant manifolds, each consisting of sets of orbits of the nonlinear system.

- An invariant manifold tangent to the stable subspace and with the same dimension is the stable manifold.
- The unstable manifold is of the same dimension and tangent to the unstable subspace.
- A center manifold is of the same dimension and tangent to the center subspace. If, as is common, the eigenvalues of the center subspace are all precisely zero, rather than just real part zero, then a center manifold is often called a slow manifold.

== Center manifold theorems ==
The center manifold existence theorem states that if the right-hand side function $\textbf{f}(\textbf{x})$ is $C^r$ ($r$ times continuously differentiable), then at every equilibrium point there exists a neighborhood of some finite size in which there is at least one of

- a unique $C^r$ stable manifold,
- a unique $C^r$ unstable manifold,
- and a (not necessarily unique) $C^{r-1}$ center manifold.

In example applications, a nonlinear coordinate transform to a normal form can clearly separate these three manifolds.

In the case when the unstable manifold does not exist, center manifolds are often relevant to modelling. The center manifold emergence theorem then says that the neighborhood may be chosen so that all solutions of the system staying in the neighborhood tend exponentially quickly to some solution $\textbf{y}(t)$ on the center manifold; in formulas,
$$\mathbf{x}(t)=\mathbf{y}(t)+\mathcal{O}(e^{-\beta t})\quad\text{ as }\quad t\to\infty$$
for some rate β. This theorem asserts that for a wide variety of initial conditions the solutions of the full system decay exponentially quickly to a solution on the relatively low dimensional center manifold.

A third theorem, the approximation theorem, asserts that if an approximate expression for such invariant manifolds, say $\textbf{x}=\textbf{X}(\textbf{s})$, satisfies the differential equation for the system to residuals $\mathcal{O}(|\textbf{s}|^p)$ as $\textbf{s}\to\textbf{0}$, then the invariant manifold is approximated by $\textbf{x}=\textbf{X}(\textbf{s})$ to an error of the same order, namely $\mathcal{O}(|\textbf{s}|^p)$.

=== Center manifolds of infinite-dimensional or non-autonomous systems ===
However, some applications, such as to dispersion in tubes or channels, require an infinite-dimensional center manifold. The most general and powerful theory was developed by Aulbach and Wanner. They addressed non-autonomous dynamical systems $\frac{d\textbf{x}}{dt} = \textbf{f}(\textbf{x},t)$ in infinite dimensions, with potentially infinite dimensional stable, unstable and center manifolds. Further, they usefully generalised the definition of the manifolds so that the center manifold is associated with eigenvalues such that $|\operatorname{Re}\lambda|\leq\alpha$, the stable manifold with eigenvalues $\operatorname{Re}\lambda\leq-\beta<-r\alpha$, and unstable manifold with eigenvalues $\operatorname{Re}\lambda\geq\beta>r\alpha$. They proved existence of these manifolds, and the emergence of a center manifold, via nonlinear coordinate transforms.

Potzsche and Rasmussen established a corresponding approximation theorem for such infinite dimensional, non-autonomous systems.

=== Alternative backwards theory ===
All the extant theory mentioned above seeks to establish invariant manifold properties of a specific given problem. In particular, one constructs a manifold that approximates an invariant manifold of the given system. An alternative approach is to construct exact invariant manifolds for a system that approximates the given system---called a backwards theory. The aim is to usefully apply theory to a wider range of systems, and to estimate errors and sizes of domain of validity.

This approach is cognate to the well-established backward error analysis in numerical modeling.

== Center manifold and the analysis of nonlinear systems ==
As the stability of the equilibrium correlates with the "stability" of its manifolds, the existence of a center manifold brings up the question about the dynamics on the center manifold. This is analyzed by the center manifold reduction, which, in combination with some system parameter μ, leads to the concepts of bifurcations.

== Examples ==
=== A simple example ===
Consider the system
$$\dot x=x^2,\quad \dot y=y.$$
The unstable manifold at the origin is the y axis, and the stable manifold is the trivial set {(0, 0)}. Any orbit not on the stable manifold satisfies an equation of the form $y=Ae^{-1/x}$ for some real constant A. It follows that for any real A, we can create a center manifold by piecing together the curve $y=Ae^{-1/x}$ for x > 0 with the negative x axis (including the origin). Moreover, all center manifolds have this potential non-uniqueness, although often the non-uniqueness only occurs in unphysical complex values of the variables.

=== Delay differential equations often have Hopf bifurcations ===
Another example shows how a center manifold models the Hopf bifurcation that occurs for parameter $a\approx 4$ in the delay differential equation ${dx}/{dt}=-ax(t-1)-2x^2-x^3$. Strictly, the delay makes this DE infinite-dimensional.

Fortunately, we may approximate such delays by the following trick that keeps the dimensionality finite. Define $u_1(t)=x(t)$ and approximate the time-delayed variable, $x(t-1)\approx u_3(t)$, by using the intermediaries ${du_2}/{dt}=2(u_1-u_2)$ and ${du_3}/{dt}=2(u_2-u_3)$.

For parameter near critical, $a=4+\alpha$, the delay differential equation is then approximated by the system
$$\frac{d\textbf{u}}{dt} =\left[\begin{array}{ccc} 0&0&-4\\
2&-2&0\\ 0&2&-2 \end{array}\right] \textbf{u} +
\left[\begin{array}{c}-\alpha u_3-2u_1^2-u_1^3\\ 0\\
0\end{array}\right].$$
In terms of a complex amplitude $s(t)$ and its complex conjugate $\bar s(t)$, the center manifold is
$$\textbf{u}=\left[\begin{array}{c} e^{i2t}s+e^{-i2t}\bar s\\
\frac{1-i}2e^{i2t}s +\frac{1+i}2e^{-i2t}\bar s\\
-\frac{i}2e^{i2t}s +\frac{i}2e^{-i2t}\bar s
\end{array}\right]
+{O}(\alpha+|s|^2)$$
and the evolution on the center manifold is
$$\frac{ds}{dt}= \left[
\frac{1+2i}{10}\alpha s
-\frac{3+16i}{15}|s|^2s
\right] +{ O}(\alpha^2+|s|^4)$$
This evolution shows the origin is linearly unstable for $\alpha>0\ (a>4)$, but the cubic nonlinearity then stabilises nearby limit cycles as in classic Hopf bifurcation.

== See also ==
- Invariant manifold
- Stable manifold
- Lagrangian coherent structure
- Normally hyperbolic invariant manifold

== Notes ==
=== Further reading ===
- Jack Carr (ed.). "Center manifold". Scholarpedia.
- Chicone, Carmen (2010). Ordinary differential equations with applications. Texts in applied mathematics (2nd ed.). New York, NY: Springer. ISBN 978-0-387-35794-2.
- Guckenheimer, John; Holmes, Philip (1997), Nonlinear Oscillations, Dynamical Systems, and Bifurcations of Vector Fields, Applied Mathematical Sciences, vol. 42, Berlin, New York: Springer-Verlag, ISBN 978-0-387-90819-9, corrected fifth printing.
