= Eulerian coherent structure =

In applied mathematics, objective Eulerian coherent structures (OECSs) are the instantaneously most influential surfaces or curves that exert a major influence on nearby trajectories in a dynamical system over short time-scales, and are the short-time limit of Lagrangian coherent structures (LCSs). Such influence can be of different types, but OECSs invariably create a short-term coherent trajectory pattern for which they serve as a theoretical centerpiece. While LCSs are intrinsically tied to a specific finite time interval, OECSs can be computed at any time instant regardless of the multiple and generally unknown time scales of the system.

In observations of tracer patterns in nature, one readily identifies short-term variability in material structures such as emerging and dissolving coherent features. However, it is often the underlying structure creating these features that is of interest. While individual tracer trajectories forming coherent patterns are generally sensitive with respect to changes in their initial conditions and the system parameters, OECSs are robust and reveal the instantaneous time-varying skeleton of complex dynamical systems. Despite OECSs are defined for general dynamical systems, their role in creating coherent patterns is perhaps most readily observable in fluid flows. Therefore, OECSs are suitable in a number of applications ranging from flow control to environmental assessment such as now-casting or short-term forecasting of pattern evolution, where quick operational decisions need to be made. Examples include floating debris, oil spills, surface drifters, and control of unsteady flow separation.
