= Slow manifold =

In mathematics, the slow manifold of an equilibrium point of a dynamical system occurs as the most common example of a center manifold. One of the main methods of simplifying dynamical systems, is to reduce the dimension of the system to that of the slow manifold—center manifold theory rigorously justifies the modelling. For example, some global and regional models of the atmosphere or oceans resolve the so-called quasi-geostrophic flow dynamics on the slow manifold of the atmosphere/oceanic dynamics, and is thus crucial to forecasting with a climate model.

In some cases, a slow manifold is defined to be the invariant manifold on which the dynamics are slow compared to the dynamics off the manifold. The slow manifold in a particular problem would be a sub-manifold of either the stable, unstable, or center manifold, exclusively, that has the same dimension of, and is tangent to, the eigenspace with an associated eigenvalue (or eigenvalue pair) that has the smallest real part in magnitude. This generalizes the definition described in the first paragraph. Furthermore, one might define the slow manifold to be tangent to more than one eigenspace by choosing a cut-off point in an ordering of the real part eigenvalues in magnitude from least to greatest. In practice, one should be careful to see what definition the literature is suggesting.

== Definition ==
Consider the dynamical system

$$\frac{d{\vec{x}}}{dt} = \vec f(\vec{x})$$

for an evolving state vector $\vec x(t)$ and with equilibrium point $\vec x^*$. Then the linearization of the system at the equilibrium point is

$$\frac{d{\vec{x}}}{dt} = A\vec{x} \quad \text{where } A = \frac{d\vec f}{d\vec x}(\vec x^*).$$

The matrix $A$ defines four invariant subspaces characterized by the eigenvalues $\lambda$ of the matrix: as described in the entry for the center manifold three of the subspaces are the stable, unstable and center subspaces corresponding to the span of the eigenvectors with eigenvalues $\lambda$ that have real part negative, positive, and zero, respectively; the fourth subspace is the slow subspace given by the span of the eigenvectors, and generalized eigenvectors, corresponding to the eigenvalue $\lambda=0$ precisely (more generally, corresponding to all eigenvalues with $|\lambda|\leq\alpha$ separated by a gap from all other eigenvalues, those with $|\lambda|\geq\beta>r\alpha$). The slow subspace is a subspace of the center subspace, or identical to it, or possibly empty.

Correspondingly, the nonlinear system has invariant manifolds, made of trajectories of the nonlinear system, corresponding to each of these invariant subspaces. There is an invariant manifold tangent to the slow subspace and with the same dimension; this manifold is the slow manifold.

Stochastic slow manifolds also exist for noisy dynamical systems (stochastic differential equation), as do also stochastic center, stable and unstable manifolds. Such stochastic slow manifolds are similarly useful in modeling emergent stochastic dynamics, but there are many fascinating issues to resolve such as history and future dependent integrals of the noise.

== Examples ==
=== Simple case with two variables ===
The coupled system in two variables $x(t)$ and $y(t)$

$$\frac{dx}{dt} = -xy \quad\text{ and }\quad  \frac{dy}{dt} = -y+x^2-2y^2$$

has the exact slow manifold $y=x^2$ on which the evolution is $dx/dt=-x^3$. Apart from exponentially decaying transients, this slow manifold and its evolution captures all solutions that are in the neighborhood of the origin. The neighborhood of attraction is, roughly, at least the half-space $y>-1/2$.

=== Slow dynamics among fast waves ===
Edward Norton Lorenz introduced the following dynamical system of five equations in five variables to explore the notion of a slow manifold of quasi-geostrophic flow

$$\begin{align}
\frac{dU}{dt} & = -VW+bVZ,\\[6pt]
\frac{dV}{dt} & = UW-bUZ,\\[6pt]
\frac{dW}{dt} & = -UV,\\[6pt]
\frac{dX}{dt} & = -Z,\\[6pt]
\frac{dZ}{dt} & = X+bUV.
\end{align}$$

Linearized about the origin the eigenvalue zero has multiplicity three, and there is a complex conjugate pair of eigenvalues, $\pm i$. Hence there exists a three-dimensional slow manifold (surrounded by 'fast' waves in the $X$ and $Z$ variables). Lorenz later argued a slow manifold did not exist! But normal form arguments suggest that there is a dynamical system that is exponentially close to the Lorenz system for which there is a good slow manifold.

=== Eliminate an infinity of variables ===
In modeling we aim to simplify enormously. This example uses a slow manifold to simplify the 'infinite dimensional' dynamics of a partial differential equation to a model of one ordinary differential equation. Consider a field $u(x,t)$ undergoing the nonlinear diffusion

$$\frac{\partial u}{\partial t}=u\frac{\partial^2 u}{\partial x^2} \quad\text{on the domain }-1<x<1$$

with Robin boundary conditions

$$2bu\pm(1-b)\frac{\partial u}{\partial x}=0 \quad\text{on }x=\pm1.$$

Parametrising the boundary conditions by $b$ empowers us to cover the insulating Neumann boundary condition case $b=0$, the Dirichlet boundary condition case $b=1$, and all cases between.

Now for a marvelous trick, much used in exploring dynamics with bifurcation theory. Since parameter $b$ is constant, adjoin the trivially true differential equation

$$\frac{\partial b}{\partial t}=0$$

Then in the extended state space of the evolving field and parameter, $(b,u(x))$, there exists an infinity of equilibria, not just one equilibrium, with $b=0$ (insulating) and $u=$constant, say $u=a$. Without going into details, about each and every equilibria the linearized diffusion has two zero eigenvalues and for $a>0$ all the rest are negative (less than $-\pi^2a/4$). Thus the two-dimensional dynamics on the slow manifolds emerge (see emergence) from the nonlinear diffusion no matter how complicated the initial conditions.

Here one can straightforwardly verify the slow manifold to be precisely the field $u(x,t)=a(t)(1-bx^2)$ where amplitude $a$ evolves according to

$$\frac{da}{dt}=-2a^2b \quad\text{and } \frac{db}{dt}=0.$$

That is, after the initial transients that by diffusion smooth internal structures, the emergent behavior is one of relatively slow decay of the amplitude ($a$) at a rate controlled by the type of boundary condition (constant $b$).

Notice that this slow manifold model is global in $a$ as each equilibria is necessarily in the slow subspace of each other equilibria, but is only local in parameter $b$. We cannot yet be sure how large $b$ may be taken, but the theory assures us the results do hold for some finite parameter $b$.

=== Perhaps the simplest nontrivial stochastic slow manifold ===
Stochastic modeling is much more complicated—this example illustrates just one such complication. Consider for small parameter $\epsilon$ the two variable dynamics of this linear system forced with noise from the random walk $W(t)$:

$$dx = \varepsilon y\,dt \quad\text{and}\quad dy=-y\,dt+dW \,.$$

One could simply notice that the Ornstein–Uhlenbeck process $y$ is formally the history integral

$$y=\int_{-\infty}^t \exp(s-t)\,dW(s)$$

and then assert that $x(t)$ is simply the integral of this history integral. However, this solution then inappropriately contains fast time integrals, due to the $\exp(s-t)$ in the integrand, in a supposedly long time model.

Alternatively, a stochastic coordinate transform extracts a sound model for the long term dynamics. Change variables to $(X(t),Y(t))$ where

$$y = Y + \int_{-\infty}^t \exp(s-t) \, dW(s) \quad\text{and}\quad x=X-\varepsilon Y-\varepsilon \int_{-\infty}^t \exp(s-t) \, dW(s)$$

then the new variables evolve according to the simple

$$dX = \varepsilon\,dW \quad\text{and}\quad dY=-Y\,dt.$$

In these new coordinates we readily deduce $Y(t)\to0$ exponentially quickly, leaving $X(t)=\epsilon W(t)$ undergoing a random walk to be the long term model of the stochastic dynamics on the stochastic slow manifold obtained by setting $Y=0$.

A web service constructs such slow manifolds in finite dimensions, both deterministic and stochastic.

== See also ==
- Quasi-geostrophic equations
