= Hyperbolic set =

In dynamical systems theory, a subset Λ of a smooth manifold M is said to be hyperbolic or to have a hyperbolic structure with respect to a smooth map f if its tangent bundle may be split into two invariant subbundles, one of which is contracting and the other is expanding under f, with respect to some Riemannian metric on M. An analogous definition applies to the case of flows.

In the special case when the entire manifold M is hyperbolic, the map f is called an Anosov diffeomorphism. The dynamics of f on a hyperbolic set, or hyperbolic dynamics, exhibits features of local structural stability and has been much studied, cf. Axiom A.

== Definition ==
Let M be a compact smooth manifold, f: M → M a diffeomorphism, and Df: TM → TM the differential of f. An f-invariant subset Λ of M is said to be hyperbolic, or to have a hyperbolic structure, if the restriction to Λ of the tangent bundle of M admits a splitting into a Whitney sum of two Df-invariant subbundles, called the stable bundle and the unstable bundle and denoted E^{s} and E^{u}. With respect to some Riemannian metric on M, the restriction of Df to E^{s} must be a contraction and the restriction of Df to E^{u} must be an expansion. Thus, there exist constants 0<λ<1 and c>0 such that

$$T_\Lambda M = E^s\oplus E^u$$

and

$(Df)_x E^s_x = E^s_{f(x)}$ and $(Df)_x E^u_x = E^u_{f(x)}$ for all $x\in \Lambda$

and

$\|Df^nv\| \le c\lambda^n\|v\|$ for all $v\in E^s$ and $n> 0$

and

$\|Df^{-n}v\| \le c\lambda^{n} \|v\|$ for all $v\in E^u$ and $n>0$.

If Λ is hyperbolic then there exists a Riemannian metric for which c = 1 — such a metric is called adapted.

== Examples ==
- Hyperbolic equilibrium point p is a fixed point, or equilibrium point, of f, such that (Df)_{p} has no eigenvalue with absolute value 1. In this case, Λ = {p}.
- More generally, a periodic orbit of f with period n is hyperbolic if and only if Df^{n} at any point of the orbit has no eigenvalue with absolute value 1, and it is enough to check this condition at a single point of the orbit.
