= Named prizes and medals of the Russian Academy of Sciences =

The prizes and gold medals named after prominent scientists (Russian: премии и золотые медали имени выдающихся ученых) are issued by the Russian Academy of Sciences for important scientific works, discoveries and inventions. The awards are issued in the name of the RAS according to the results of contests announced by the RAS Presidium.

== Great Gold Medals ==
- Lomonosov Gold Medal - (ru:Большая золотая медаль имени М. В. Ломоносова (Great gold medal named after M. V. Lomonosov))
- Pirogov Gold Medal - (Большая золотая медаль имени Н. И. Пирогова (Great gold medal named after N. I. Pirogov)

== Mathematics ==
- Bogolyubov Medal - (ru:Золотая медаль имени Н. Н. Боголюбова (after N. N. Bogolyubov))
- Keldysh Medal - (ru:Золотая медаль имени М. В. Келдыша (after M. V. Keldysh))
- Chebyshev Medal - (ru:Золотая медаль имени П. Л. Чебышёва (after P. L. Chebyshev))
- Leonard Euler Medal - (ru:Золотая медаль имени Леонарда Эйлера (after Leonard Euler))
- I.M. Vinogradov Prize - (ru:Премия имени И. М. Виноградова (after I. M. Vinogradov, mathematician))
- Kovalevskaya Prize - (ru:Премия имени С. В. Ковалевской (after S. V. Kovalevskaya, mathematician))
- Kolmogorov Prize - (ru:Премия имени А. Н. Колмогорова (after A. N. Kolmogorov, mathematician))
- Lavrent'ev Prize - (ru:Премия имени М. А. Лаврентьева (after M. A. Lavrent'ev, mathematician))
- Lobachevsky Prize - (ru:Премия имени Н. И. Лобачевского (after N. I. Lobachevsky, mathematician))
- Lyapunov Prize - (ru:Премия имени А. М. Ляпунова (after A. M. Lyapunov, mathematician))
- Maltsev Prize - (ru:Премия имени А. И. Мальцева (after A. I. Maltsev, mathematician))
- Markov Prize - (ru:Премия имени А. А. Маркова (after A. A. Markov, mathematician))
- Petrovsky Prize - (ru:Премия имени И. Г. Петровского (after I. G. Petrovsky, mathematician))

== Physical sciences ==
- S.I. Vavilov Medal - (ru:Золотая медаль имени С. И. Вавилова (after S. I. Vavilov))
- Kapitsa Medal - (ru:Золотая медаль имени П. Л. Капицы (after P. L. Kapitsa))
- Lebedev Medal - (ru:Золотая медаль имени П. Н. Лебедева (after P. N. Lebedev))
- Kurchatov Medal - (ru:Золотая медаль имени И. В. Курчатова (after I. V. Kurchatov))
- Landau Gold Medal - (ru:Золотая медаль имени Л. Д. Ландау (after L. D. Landau))
- Sakharov Medal - (ru:Золотая медаль имени А. Д. Сахарова (after A. D. Sakharov))
- Skobeltsyn Medal - (ru:Золотая медаль имени Д. В. Скобельцына (after D. V. Skobeltsyn))
- Artsimovich Prize - (ru:Премия имени Л. А. Арцимовича (after L. A. Artsimovich, physicist))
- Belopolski Prize - (ru:Премия имени А. А. Белопольского (after A. A. Belopolsky, astronomer))
- Bredikhin Prize - (ru:Премия имени Ф. А. Бредихина (after F. A. Bredikhin, astronomer))
- Veksler Prize - (ru:Премия имени В. И. Векслера (after V. I. Veksler, physicist))
- Ioffe Prize - (ru:Премия имени А. Ф. Иоффе (after A. F. Ioffe, physicist))
- Mandelstam Prize - (ru:Премия имени Л. И. Мандельштама (after L. I. Mandelstam, physicist))
- Rozhdestvensky Prize - (ru:Премия имени Д. С. Рождественского (after D. S. Rozhdestvensky))
- Stoletov Prize - (ru:Премия имени А. Г. Столетова (after A. G. Stoletov, physicist))
- Tamm Prize - (ru:Премия имени И. Е. Тамма (after I. E. Tamm, physicist))
- Federov Prize - (ru:Премия имени Е. С. Федорова (after E. S. Fedorov, mathematician))
- Fock Prize - (ru:Премия имени В. А. Фока (after V. A. Fock, physicist))
- Friedmann Prize - ru:Премия имени А. А. Фридмана (after A. A. Friedman, physicist))
- Cherenkov Prize - (ru:Премия имени П. А. Черенкова (after P. A. Cherenkov, physicist))

== Information Technology ==
- Popov Medal - (ru:Золотая медаль имени А. С. Попова (after A. P. Popov))
- Krylov Prize - (ru:Премия имени А. Н. Крылова (after A. N. Krylov, naval engineer))
- S.A. Lebedev Prize - (ru:Премия имени С. А. Лебедева (after S. A. Lebedev, electrical engineer))
- Raspletin Prize - (ru:Премия имени А. А. Расплетина (after A. A. Raspletin))

== Energy, Mechanical Engineering, Mechanics and Control Processes ==
- Alexandrov Medal - (ru:Золотая медаль имени А. П. Александрова (after A. P. Alexandrov))
- Korolev Medal - (ru:Золотая медаль имени С. П. Королева (after S. P. Korolev))
- Chaplygin Medal - (ru:Золотая медаль имени С. А. Чаплыгина (after S. A. Chaplygin))
- Andronov Prize - (ru:Премия имени А. А. Андронова (Prize named after A. A. Andronov, physicist))
- Krzhizhanovsky Prize - (ru:Премия имени Г. М. Кржижановского (after G. M. Krzhizhanovsky, electrical engineer))
- Petrov Prize - (ru:Премия имени Б. Н. Петрова (after B. N. Petrov))
- Tupolev Prize - (ru:Премия имени А. Н. Туполева (after A. N. Tupolev, aircraft designer))
- Tsander Prize - (ru:Премия имени Ф. А. Цандера (after F. A. Tsander, rocket engineer))
- Tsiolkovsky Prize - (ru:Премия имени К. Э. Циолковского (after K. E. Tsiolkovsky, aeronautics engineer))
- Yablochkov Prize - (ru:Премия имени П. Н. Яблочкова (after P. N. Yablochkov, electrical engineer))

== Chemistry and Material Science ==
- Mendeleev Medal - (ru:Золотая медаль имени Д. И. Менделеева (after D. I. Mendeleev))
- Semenov Medal - (ru:Золотая медаль имени Н. Н. Семенова (after N. N. Semenov, chemist))
- Kurnakov Medal - (ru:Золотая медаль имени Н. С. Курнакова (after N. S. Kurnakov))
- Chernov Medal - (ru:Золотая медаль имени Д. К. Чернова (after D. K. Chernov))
- Anosov Prize - (ru:Премия имени П. П. Аносова (after P. P. Anosov, mining engineer))
- Balandin Prize - (ru:Премия имени А. А. Баландина (after A. A. Balandin, electrical engineer))
- Bardin Prize - (ru:Премия имени И. П. Бардина (after I. P. Bardin, metallurgist))
- Bochvar Prize - (ru:Премия имени А. А. Бочвара (after A. A. Bochvar))
- Butlerov Prize - (ru:Премия имени А. М. Бутлерова (after A. M. Butlerov, chemist))
- Grebenshchikov Prize - (ru:Премия имени И. В. Гребенщикова (after I. V. Grebenshchikov))
- Zelinsky Prize - (ru:Премия имени Н.Д.Зелинского (after N. D. Zelinsky, chemist))
- Ipatyev Prize - (ru:Премия имени В. Н. Ипатьева (after V. N. Ipatyev, chemist))
- Kargin Prize - (ru:Премия имени В. А. Каргина (after V. A. Kargin))
- Koptyuga Prize - (ru:Премия имени В. А. Коптюга (after V. A. Koptyuga, chemist))
- Lebedev Prize - (ru:Премия имени С. В. Лебедева (after S. V. Lebedev, chemist))
- Nesmeyanov Prize - (ru:Премия имени А. Н. Несмеянова (after A. N. Nesmeyanov, chemist))
- Rebinder Prize - (ru:Премия имени П. А. Ребиндера (after P. A. Rebinder))
- Khlopin Prize - (ru:Премия имени В. Г. Хлопина (after V. G. Khlopin, nuclear physicist))
- Chugaev Prize - (ru:Премия имени М. М. Шемякина (after L. A. Chugaev, chemist))

== Biology ==
- Bekhterev Medal - (ru:Золотая медаль имени В. М. Бехтерева (after V. M. Bekhterev))
- Pavlov Medal - (ru:Золотая медаль имени И. П. Павлова (after I. P. Pavlov))
- Sechenov Medal - (ru:Золотая медаль имени И. М. Сеченова (after I. M. Sechenov))
- Engelhardt Medal - (ru:Золотая медаль имени В. А. Энгельгардта (after V. A. Engelhardt))
- Vavilov Medal - (ru:Золотая медаль имени Н. И. Вавилова (after N. I. Vavilov))
- Dokucgaev Medal - (ru:Золотая медаль имени В. В. Докучаева (after V. V. Dokuchaev))
- Baev Prize - (ru:Премия имени А. А. Баева (after A. A. Baev))
- Bach Prize - (ru:Премия имени А. Н. Баха (after A. N. Bach))
- Belozersky Prize - (ru:Премия имени А. Н. Белозерского (after A. N. Belozersky, biologist))
- Winogradsky Prize - (ru:Премия имени С. Н. Виноградского (after S. N. Vinogradsky microbiologist))
- Kovalevsky Prize - (ru:Премия имени А. О. Ковалевского (after A. O. Kovalevsky, embryologist))
- Koltsov Prize - (ru:Премия имени Н. К. Кольцова (after N. K. Koltsov, biologist))
- Komorov Prize - (ru:Премия имени В. Л. Комарова (after V. L. Komarov, botanist))
- Metchnikov Prize - (ru:Премия имени И. И. Мечникова (after I. I. Mechnikov, zoologist))
- Ovchinnikov Prize - (ru:Премия имени Ю. А. Овчинникова (after Yu. A. Ovchinnikov, biochemist))
- Orbeli Prize - (ru:Премия имени Л. А. Орбели (after L. A. Orbeli, physiologist))
- Pavlovsky Prize - (ru:Премия имени Е. Н. Павловского (after E. N. Pavlovsky, zoologist))
- Prianishkov Prize - (ru:Премия имени Д. Н. Прянишникова (after D. N. Prianishnikov))
- Severtsov Prize - (ru:Премия имени А. Н. Северцова (after A. . Severtsov))
- Scriabin Prize - (ru:Премия имени К. И. Скрябина (after K. I. Scriabin, parasitologist))
- Sukachev Prize - (ru:Премия имени В. Н. Сукачева (after V. N. Sukachev, geobotanist))
- Timiryazev Prize - (ru:Премия имени К. А. Тимирязева (after K. A. Timiryazev, botanist))
- Ukhtomsky Prize - (ru:Премия имени А. А. Ухтомского (after A. A. Ukhtomsky, physiologist))
- Shemyakin Prize - (ru:Премия имени М. М. Шемякина (after M. M. Shemyakin))
- Schmalhausen Prize - (ru:Премия имени И. И. Шмальгаузена (after I. I. Schmalhausen, zoologist))

== Earth Sciences ==
- Vernadsky Medal - (ru:Золотая медаль имени В. И. Вернадского (after V. I. Vernadsky))
- Karpinsky Medal - (ru:Золотая медаль имени А. П. Карпинского (after A. P. Karpinsky))
- Berg Medal - (ru:Золотая медаль имени Л. С. Берга (Gold medal named after L. S. Berg))
- Arkhangelsky Prize - (ru:Премия имени А. Д. Архангельского (after A.A. Arkhangelsky, geologist))
- A.P. Vinogradov Prize - (ru:Премия имени А. П. Виноградова (after A. P. Vinogradov, geochemist))
- Golitsyn Prize - (ru:Премия имени Б. Б. Голицына (after B. B. Golitsyn, physicist))
- Grigoriev Prixe - (ru:Премия имени А. А. Григорьева (after A. A. Grigoriev))
- Gubkin Prize - (ru:Премия имени И. М. Губкина (after I. M. Gubkin, geologist))
- Korzhinsky Prize - (ru:Премия имени Д. С. Коржинского (after D. S. Korzhinsky))
- Makarov Prize - (ru:Премия имени С. О. Макарова (after S. O. Makarov, oceanographer))
- Melnikov Prize - (ru:Премия имени Н. В. Мельникова (after N. V. Melnikov))
- Obruchev Prize - (ru:Премия имени В. А.Обручева (after V. A. Obruchev, geologist))
- Savarensky Prize - (ru:Премия имени Ф. П. Саваренского (after F. P. Savarensky))
- Smirnov Prize - (ru:Премия имени С. С. Смирнова (after S. S. Smirnov, geologist))
- Fersman Prize - (ru:Премия имени А. Е. Ферсмана (after A. E. Fersman, geochemist))
- Shatsky Prize - (ru:Премия имени Н. С. Шатского (after Nikolay Shatsky, geologist))
- Schmidt Prize - (ru:Премия имени О. Ю. Шмидта (after O. Yu. Schmidt, mathematician))

== Social science ==
- Speransky Medal - (ru:Золотая медаль имени М. М. Сперанского (after M. M. Speransky, political advisor))
- Vargi Prize - (ru:Премия имени Е. С. Варги (after E. S. Vargi, economist))
- Kantorovich Prize - (ru:Премия имени Л. В. Канторовича (after L. V. Kantorovich, mathematician))
- M.M. Kovalevsky Prize - (ru:Премия имени М. М. Ковалевского (after M. M. Kovalevsky, sociologist))
- Kondratiev Prize - (ru:Премия имени Н. Д. Кондратьева (after N. D. Kondratiev, economist))
- Koni Prize - (ru:Премия имени А. Ф. Кони (after A. F. Koni))
- Martens Prize - (ru:Премия имени Ф. Ф. Мартенса (after F. F. Martens, jurist))
- Nemchinov Prize - (ru:Премия имени В. С. Немчинова (after V. S. Nemchinov, economist))
- Plekhanov Prize - (ru:Премия имени Г. В. Плеханова (after G. V. Plekhanov, Marxist theoretician))
- Rubinstein Prize - (ru:Премия имени С. Л. Рубинштейна (after S. L. Rubinstein))
- Tarle Prize - (ru:Премия имени Е. В. Тарле (after E. V. Tarle, historian))
- Chayanov Prize - (ru:Премия имени А. В. Чаянова (after A. V. Chayanov, economist))

== History and philology ==
- Dal Medal - (ru:Золотая медаль имени В. И. Даля (after V. I. Dal))
- Solovyov Medal - (ru:Золотая медаль имени С. М. Соловьёва (after S. M. Solovyov, historian))
- Veselovsky Prize - (ru:Премия имени А. Н. Веселовского (after A. N. Veselovsky, literary theorist))
- Zabelin Prize - (ru:Премия имени И. Е. Забелина (after I. E. Zabelin, historian))
- Kareev Prize - (ru:Премия имени Н. И. Кареева (after N. I. Kareev))
- Klyuchevsky Prize - (ru:Премия имени В. О. Ключевского (after V. O. Klyuchevsky, historian))
- Likhachev Prize - (ru:Премия имени Д. С. Лихачёва (after D. S. Likhachev, linguist))
- Miklukho-Maclay Prize - (ru:Премия имени Н. Н. Миклухо-Маклая (after N. N. Miklukho-Maclay, biologist))
- Oldenburg Prize - (ru:Премия имени С. Ф. Ольденбурга (after S. F. Oldenburg))
- Pushkin Prize - (ru:Премия имени А. С. Пушкина (after A. S. Pushkin, poet))
- Shakhmatov Prize - (ru:Премия имени А. А. Шахматова (after A. A. Shakhmatov, historian))
