= SNA =

SNA or Sna may refer to:

== Organizations ==
- Novinite.com (Sofia News Agency), Bulgaria's largest English-language news provider
- Shanni Nationalities Army
- Singapore National Academy, a school in Surabaya, Indonesia
- Sky News Australia, an Australian 24-hour news channel
- Snap-on, an American tool company (NYSE: SNA)
- Social-National Assembly, a Ukrainian far-right political group
- Somali National Army, the land based branch of the Somali Armed Forces
- Somali National Alliance, a faction in the Somali Civil War from 1992
- Sangeet Natak Akademi, the national level academy for performing arts in India
- Suzhou North America High School
- Stellantis North America, an automobile manufacturer
- Syrian National Army, also known as the Turkish-backed Free Syrian Army
- Sociedad Nacional de Agricultura, Chile

== Science and technology ==
- Social network analysis
- Systems Network Architecture, an IBM computer networking protocol suite
- Elderberry lectin, by lectin symbol
- Spherical Nucleic Acids
- .sna, snapshot file used in ZX Spectrum emulation
- SNA (computer graphics), a graphics acceleration architecture
- Sympathetic nervous system activity
- Strange nonchaotic attractor
- Scalar network analyzer (electrical)

== Transport ==
- John Wayne Airport, by IATA airport code
- Sandal and Agbrigg railway station, by National Rail station code
- Santa Ana (Amtrak station), by Amtrak station code

== Other uses ==
- Senator Ninoy Aquino, Sultan Kudarat, Philippines
- System of National Accounts, an international standard for economic data
- Student Naval Aviator, training to be a United States Naval Aviator
- Special needs assistant, teaching assistant supporting students with extra needs
- sna, the ISO 639 code of the Shona language of Southern Africa
- Significant Natural Area, a classification in the Resource Management Act in New Zealand
