= Nikolay V. Kuznetsov =

Russian scientist (born 1979)

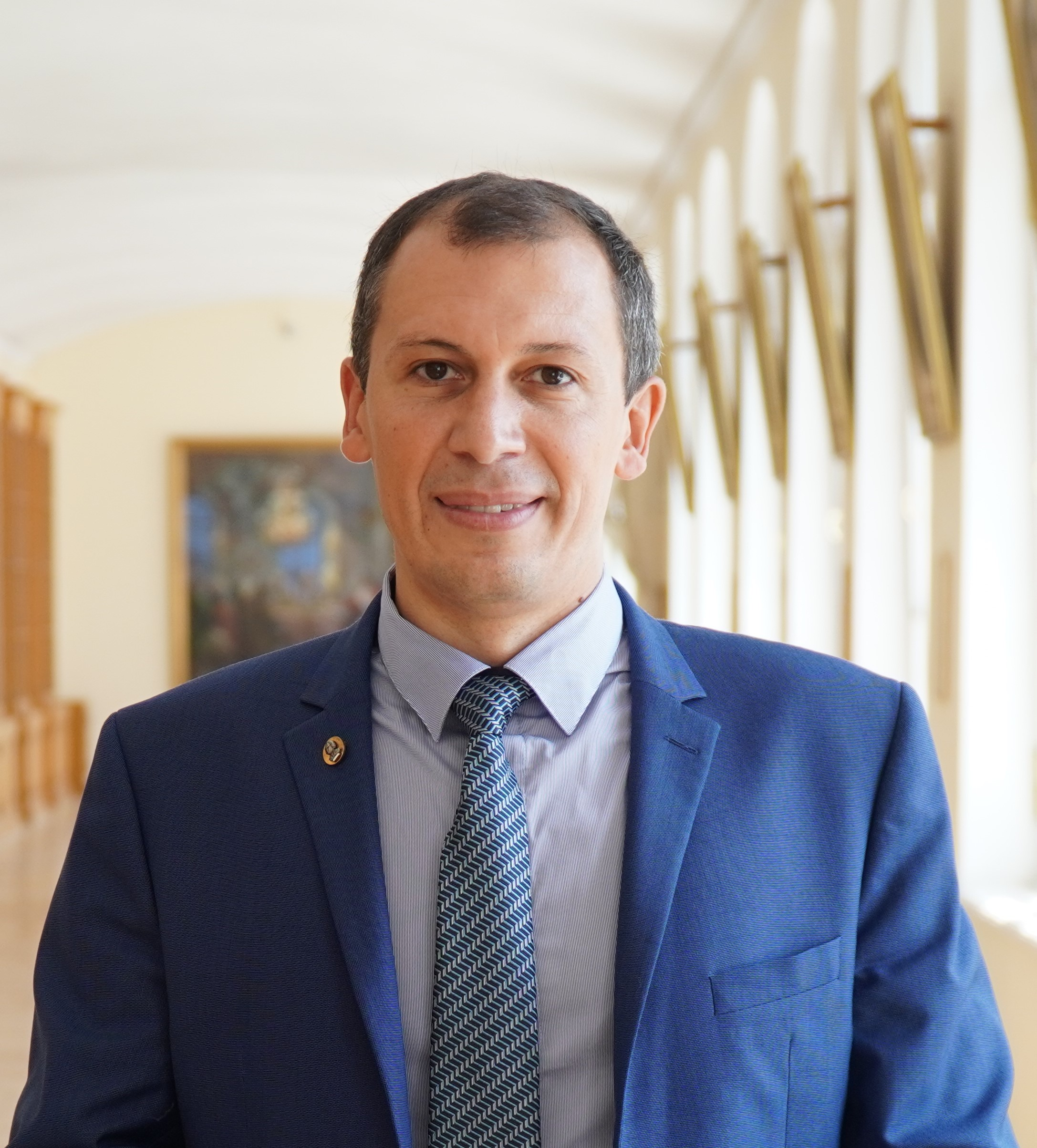
- Born: 13 May 1979 (age 47); Leningrad
- Education: St. Petersburg University
- Known for: theory of hidden oscillations, hidden attractors, nonlinear analysis of phase-locked loops
- Awards: State Prize of the Russian Federation (2025), Andronov Prize (2024), Afraimovich Award (2021), Highly Cited Researchers (2019-2021), Medal of the University of Jyväskylä (2017)
- Scientific career
- Fields: nonlinear dynamics, control
- Workplaces: St. Petersburg University, University of Jyväskylä
- Doctoral students: see Mathematics Genealogy Project

Nikolay Vladimirovich Kuznetsov (Russian: Николай Владимирович Кузнецов; born 13 May 1979 in Leningrad, USSR) is a specialist in nonlinear dynamics and control theory, and the founder of the theory of hidden oscillations.

== Academic career ==
He graduated from the St. Petersburg University, Department of Theoretical Cybernetics chaired by V.A. Yakubovich, in 2001. In 2004 he received Candidate of Science degree (supervisor G.A. Leonov) and in 2016 Doctor of Science degree (Habilitation) from St. Petersburg University. From 2003 Nikolay Kuznetsov has been working in St. Petersburg University and now he is Full professor (tenured) and Head of the Department of Applied Cybernetics there. Since 2018 the research group chaired by Kuznetsov has been awarded the status of the Leading Scientific School (Center of Excellence) of Russia in the field of mathematics and mechanics. In 2020 he was named Professor of the Year in the field of mathematics and physics in Russia.

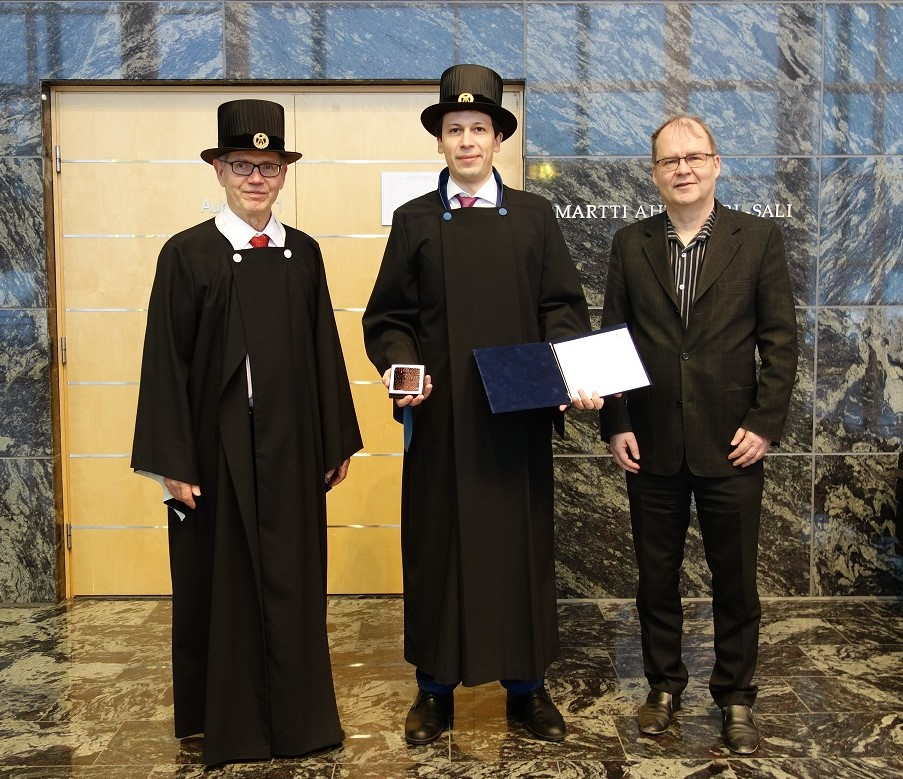
Medal of the University of Jyväskylä is awarded to Prof. Kuznetsov (2017).

Since 2018, Kuznetsov is Head of the Laboratory of information and control systems at the Institute for Problems in Mechanical Engineering of the Russian Academy of Science. In 2022, Nikolay Kuznetsov was elected a member of the Russian Academy of Science.

In 2008, Kuznetsov defended his Ph.D. degree at the University of Jyväskylä, Finland (supervisors P. Neittaanmäki, G.A. Leonov). After the defense, he has been working at the University of Jyväskylä as the Academy of Finland postdoc, then as a part-time professor at the IT Faculty: from 2014 he is Adjunct Docent and from 2017 – Visiting Professor. He is co-chair of the Finnish-Russian educational & research program organized in 2007 by the University of Jyväskylä and St. Petersburg University. As a recognition, University of Jyväskylä awarded him a medal for his distinguished merits in the field of applied mathematics and training doctoral students, in 2020 he got the Finnish Information Processing Association (TIVIA) award and was elected a foreign member of the Finnish Academy of Science and Letters (becoming its youngest foreign member at the time of election). In 2021, the joint educational & research program was expanded to include the Lappeenranta-Lahti University of Technology, where Kuznetsov was offered the position of Visiting Professor. The experience of the program he used in 2013 when organizing the first defenses to the Ph.D. degree granted by St. Petersburg University, instead of the Candidate of Sciences degrees awarded by the State Supreme Certification Commission.

== Scientific work ==
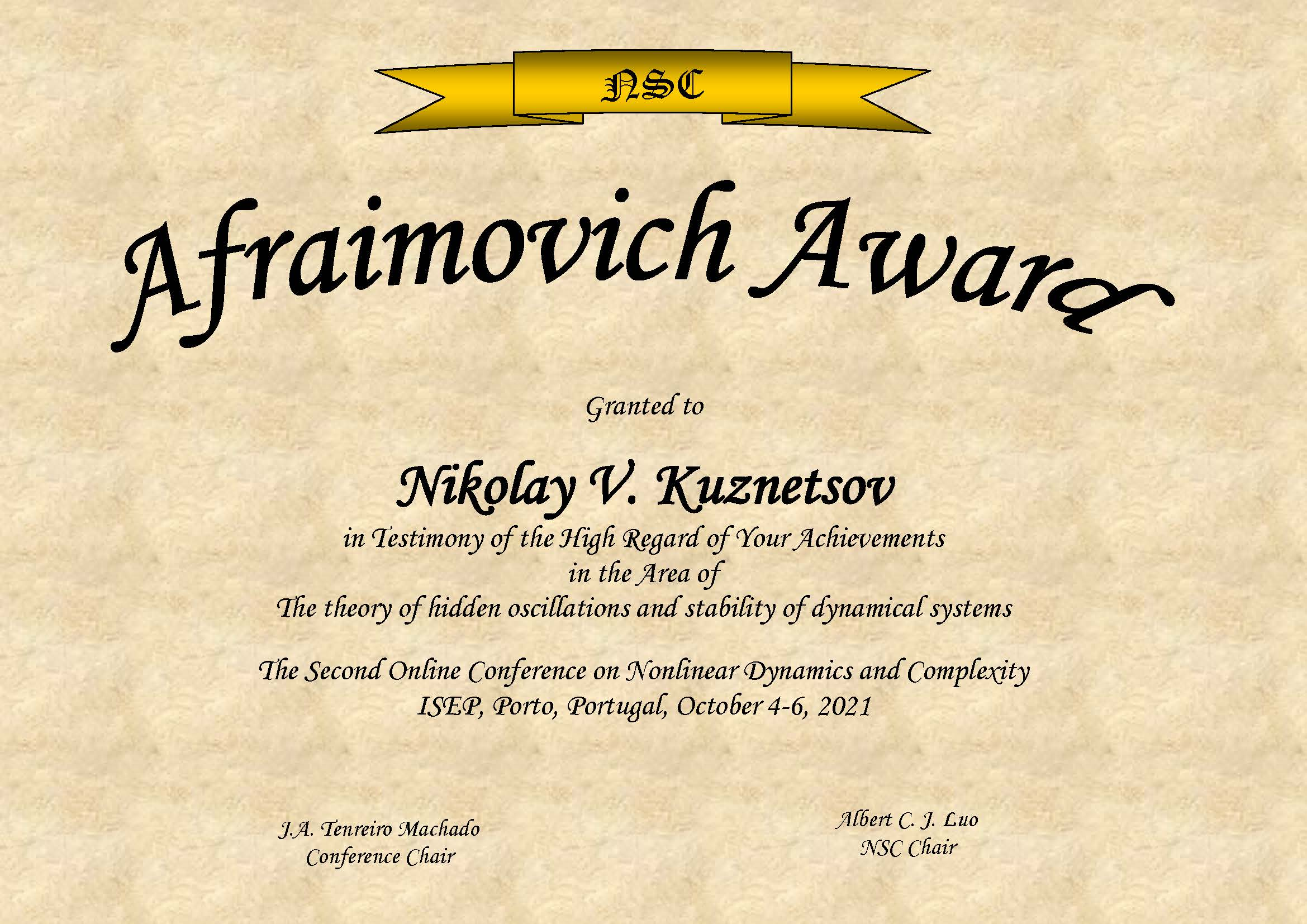
Afraimovich Award granted to N. Kuznetsov for The theory of hidden oscillations and stability of dynamical systems (2021)

Kuznetsov’s research interests are in dynamical systems and applied mathematics. In his works, a combination of rigorous analytical and reliable numerical methods allowed for both the advancement in solving previously known fundamental unsolved problems as well as the development of modern engineering technologies. N. Kuznetsov introduced the concept of self-excited and hidden attractors, laying out the foundations for the theory of hidden oscillations. Among his main results are the discovery of a hidden Chua attractor in Chua circuits, revealing of coexisting hidden attractors in electromechanical models with Sommerfeld effect, solutions to the Egan problem on the pull-in range, to the Gardner problem on the lock-in range, and to the Viterbi problem on the coincidence of phase-locked loop ranges for phase-locked loops, nonlinear analysis of the CP-PLL and validation of the Gardner conjecture, counterexamples with self-excited and hidden attractors to the classical describing function method, developed effective analytical-numerical methods for the construction of counterexamples to the Kalman conjecture on the absolute stability of control systems, provided justification of time-varying linearization and analysis of Perron effects of the Lyapunov exponent sign reversal, effective analytical-numerical method for the finite-time and exact Lyapunov dimension computation, and proof of the Eden conjecture for a number of dynamical systems.

== Awadrs and recognition ==
The Web of Science Group proclaimed Kuznetsov a Highly Cited Researcher in Russia twice over two consecutive years (2016-2017) and included him in the worldwide list of Highly Cited Researchers in 2019 (where he was among 3 scientists from St. Petersburg University and the only one from the University of Jyväskylä), 2020, and 2021.

He was awarded the St. Petersburg University Prize in 2020, the Afraimovich Award of NSC society in 2021, and the Andronov Prize of the Russian Academy of Science in 2024 for the theory of hidden oscillations and stability of dynamical systems.

In 2025, Nikolay V. Kuznetsov was awarded State Prize of the Russian Federation in Science and Technology (the highest scientific award of the Russian Federation) for creating and developing a new scientific field - the theory of hidden oscillations.

== Selected publications: books and surveys ==
- Kuznetsov, N.V.; Lobachev, M.Yu.; Yuldashev, M.V.; Yuldashev, R.V.; Tavazoei, M.S. (2023). "The Gardner Problem on the Lock-In Range of Second-Order Type 2 Phase-Locked Loops". IEEE Transactions on Automatic Control. 68 (12): 7436–7450. doi:10.1109/TAC.2023.3277896.
- Kuznetsov N. V.; Mokaev T. N.; Ponomarenko V. I.; Seleznev E. P.; Stankevich N. V.; Chua L. (2023). "Hidden attractors in Chua circuit: mathematical theory meets physical experiments" (PDF). Nonlinear Dynamics. 111 (6): 5859–5887. doi:10.1007/s11071-022-08078-y. S2CID 255049732.
- Kuznetsov, Nikolay; Reitmann, Volker (2021). Attractor Dimension Estimates for Dynamical Systems: Theory and Computation (PDF). Emergence, Complexity and Computation. Vol. 38. Cham: Springer. doi:10.1007/978-3-030-50987-3. ISBN 978-3-030-50986-6. S2CID 224845580.
- Wang, X.; Kuznetsov, N.V.; Chen, G. (2021). Chaotic Systems with Multistability and Hidden Attractors (PDF). Emergence, Complexity and Computation. Vol. 40. Cham: Springer. doi:10.1007/978-3-030-75821-9. ISBN 978-3-030-75820-2. S2CID 244816603.
- Kuznetsov N.V. (2020). "Theory of hidden oscillations and stability of control systems" (PDF). Journal of Computer and Systems Sciences International. 59 (5): 647–668. doi:10.1134/S1064230720050093. S2CID 225304463.
- Kuznetsov, N.V.; Matveev, A.S.; Yuldashev, M.V.; Yuldashev, R.V. (2021). "Nonlinear Analysis of Charge-Pump Phase-Locked Loop: The Hold-In and Pull-In Ranges". IEEE Transactions on Circuits and Systems I: Regular Papers. 68 (10): 4049–4061. arXiv:2005.00864. doi:10.1109/TCSI.2021.3101529.
- Kuznetsov, N.V.; Lobachev, M.Y.; Yuldashev, M.V.; Yuldashev, R.V. (2021). "The Egan problem on the pull-in range of type 2 PLLs". IEEE Transactions on Circuits and Systems II: Express Briefs. 68 (4): 1467–1471. doi:10.1109/TCSII.2020.3038075.
- Kuznetsov, N.V.; Mokaev, T.N.; Kuznetsova, O.A.; Kudryashova, E.V. (2020). "The Lorenz system: hidden boundary of practical stability and the Lyapunov dimension" (PDF). Nonlinear Dynamics. 102 (2): 713–732. doi:10.1007/s11071-020-05856-4.
- Kuznetsov, N.V.; Leonov, G.A.; Mokaev, T.N.; Prasad, A.; Shrimali, M.D. (2018). "Finite-time Lyapunov dimension and hidden attractor of the Rabinovich system" (PDF). Nonlinear Dynamics. 92 (2): 267–285. arXiv:1504.04723. doi:10.1007/s11071-018-4054-z. S2CID 54706479.
- Dudkowski D.; Jafari S.; Kapitaniak T.; Kuznetsov N. V.; Leonov G. A.; Prasad A. (2016). "Hidden attractors in dynamical systems" (PDF). Physics Reports. 637: 1–50. Bibcode:2016PhR...637....1D. doi:10.1016/j.physrep.2016.05.002.
- Best, R.; Kuznetsov, N.V.; Leonov, G.A.; Yuldashev, M.V.; Yuldashev, R.V. (2016). "Tutorial on dynamic analysis of the Costas loop". IFAC Annual Reviews in Control. 42: 27–49. arXiv:1511.04435. doi:10.1016/j.arcontrol.2016.08.003. S2CID 10703739.
- Leonov, G. A.; Kuznetsov, N. V.; Yuldashev, M. V.; Yuldashev, R. V. (2015). "Hold-in, pull-in, and lock-in ranges of PLL circuits: rigorous mathematical definitions and limitations of classical theory". IEEE Transactions on Circuits and Systems I: Regular Papers. 62 (10). IEEE: 2454–2464. arXiv:1505.04262. doi:10.1109/TCSI.2015.2476295. S2CID 12292968.
- Leonov, G. A.; Kuznetsov, N. V. (2013). "Hidden attractors in dynamical systems. From hidden oscillations in Hilbert–Kolmogorov, Aizerman, and Kalman problems to hidden chaotic attractor in Chua circuits". International Journal of Bifurcation and Chaos. 23 (1): 1330002–219. Bibcode:2013IJBC...2330002L. doi:10.1142/S0218127413300024.
- Leonov, G. A.; Kuznetsov, N. V. (2007). "Time-Varying Linearization and the Perron effects" (PDF). International Journal of Bifurcation and Chaos. 17 (4): 1079–1107. Bibcode:2007IJBC...17.1079L. CiteSeerX 10.1.1.660.43. doi:10.1142/S0218127407017732.
