= Eden's conjecture =

In the mathematics of dynamical systems, Eden's conjecture states that the supremum of the local Lyapunov dimensions on the global attractor is achieved on a stationary point or an unstable periodic orbit embedded into the attractor. The validity of the conjecture was proved for a number of well-known systems having global attractor (e.g. for the global attractors in the Lorenz system, complex Ginzburg–Landau equation). It is named after Alp Eden, who proposed it in 1987.

== Kuznetsov–Eden's conjecture ==
For local attractors, a conjecture on the Lyapunov dimension of self-excited attractor, refined by N. Kuznetsov, is stated that for a typical system, the Lyapunov dimension of a self-excited attractor does not exceed the Lyapunov dimension of one of the unstable equilibria, the unstable manifold of which intersects with the basin of attraction and visualizes the attractor. The conjecture is valid, e.g., for the classical self-excited Lorenz attractor; for the self-excited attractors in the Hénon map (even in the case of multistability and coexistence of local attractors with different Lyapunov dimensions). For a hidden attractor the conjecture is that the maximum of the local Lyapunov dimensions is achieved on an unstable periodic orbit embedded into the attractor.
