= Andronov (crater) =

Crater on the Moon

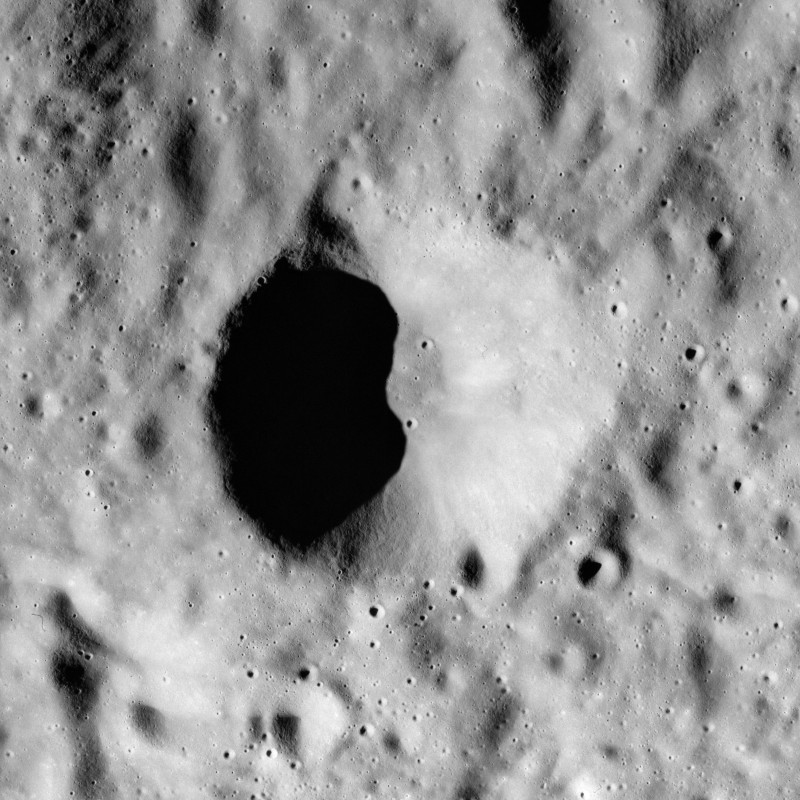
- Apollo 15 image
- Coordinates: 22.7°S 146.1°E
- Diameter: 16.57 km (10.30 mi)
- Depth: Unknown
- Colongitude: 214° at sunrise
- Eponym: Aleksandr A. Andronov

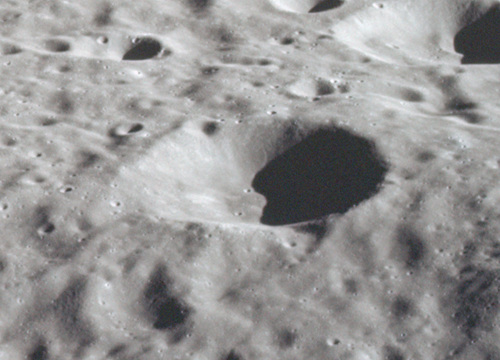
Oblique view from Apollo 17

Andronov is a small lunar impact crater that lies across the southwest rim of the walled plain named Gagarin. It is located on the southern hemisphere of the far side of the Moon, and can not be seen directly from the Earth. Just to the west of Andronov is the crater Levi-Civita.

Andronov is a circular, bowl-shaped formation with a small central floor. There is a tiny craterlet in the northern interior wall. This feature is otherwise unremarkable, and is similar in appearance to many other small craters to be found across the lunar surface.

This crater is named after Soviet physicist Aleksandr A. Andronov (1901-1952). Its designation was formally adopted by the International Astronomical Union in 1976.
