= Gennady Leonov =

Russian scientist

Gennady Alexeyevich Leonov
- Born: February 2, 1947; Leningrad, Russian SFSR
- Died: April 23, 2018 (aged 71); Saint Petersburg, Russian Federation
- Education: Leningrad State University
- Awards: USSR State Prize (1986); 2012 Aleksandr Andronov Russian Academy of Sciences Prize
- Scientific career
- Fields: Automatic control, Applied mathematics
- Workplaces: Saint Petersburg State University
- Notable students: Nikolay Kuznetsov

Gennady Alexeyevich Leonov (Russian: Геннадий Алексеевич Леонов; February 2, 1947 in Leningrad, Soviet Union – April 23, 2018) was a Russian scientist, Correspondent Member of the Russian Academy of Sciences (since 2006), Professor at the Saint Petersburg State University, Doctor of Sciences. Laureate of the 1986 USSR State Prize and 2012 Aleksandr Andronov Russian Academy of Sciences Prize.

He graduated from the Leningrad State University in 1969.

In 1971 he defended his Candidate's Dissertation. In 1983 he defended his doctoral dissertation. In 1986 he received the title of Professor.

Since 1988, he served as Dean of the Faculty of Mathematics and Mechanics of the Saint Petersburg State University.

He was a foreign member of the Finnish Academy of Science and Letters (2017).

== Obituaries ==
- Abramovich S.; Kuznetsov N.; Razov A. (2021). "G.A. Leonov: eminent scholar, admired teacher and unconventional administrator". Journal of Physics: Conference Series. 1864 (1) 012066. Bibcode:2021JPhCS1864a2066A. doi:10.1088/1742-6596/1864/1/012066.
- N.V. Kuznetsov, S. Abramovich, A.L. Fradkov, G. Chen, In Memoriam: Gennady Alekseevich Leonov, International Journal of Bifurcation and Chaos, 28(5), 2018, art. num. 1877001
- S. Abramovich, N.V. Kuznetsov, P. Neittaanmäki, Obituary: Gennady Alekseevich Leonov (1947-2018), Open Mathematical Education Notes, 8(1), 2018, 15-21
