= Lorenz system =

Chaotic model of atmospheric convection

A sample solution in the Lorenz attractor when ρ = 28, σ = 10, and β = 8/3

The Lorenz system is a set of three ordinary differential equations, first developed by the meteorologist Edward Lorenz while studying atmospheric convection. It is a classic example of a system that can exhibit chaotic behavior, meaning that its output can be highly sensitive to small changes in its starting conditions.

For certain values of its parameters, the system's solutions form a complex, looping pattern known as the Lorenz attractor. The shape of this attractor, when graphed, is famously said to resemble a butterfly. The system's extreme sensitivity to initial conditions gave rise to the popular concept of the butterfly effect—the idea that a small event, like the flap of a butterfly's wings, could ultimately alter large-scale weather patterns. While the system is deterministic—its future behavior is fully determined by its initial conditions—its chaotic nature makes long-term prediction practically impossible.

The behavior of the system depends on the choice of parameters. For some ranges of parameters, the system is predictable: trajectories settle into fixed points or simple periodic orbits, making the long-term behavior easy to describe. For example, when ρ < 1, all solutions converge to the origin, and for certain moderate values of ρ, σ, and β, solutions converge to symmetric steady states.

In contrast, for other parameter ranges, the system becomes chaotic. With the well-known parameters σ = 10, ρ = 28, and β = 8/3, the solutions never settle down but instead trace out the butterfly-shaped Lorenz attractor. In this regime, small differences in initial conditions grow exponentially.

== Overview ==
In 1963, Edward Lorenz developed the system as a simplified mathematical model for atmospheric convection. He was attempting to model the way air moves when heated from below and cooled from above. The model describes how three key properties of this system change over time:

x is proportional to the intensity of the convection (the rate of fluid flow),
y is proportional to the temperature difference between the rising and falling air currents,
z is proportional to the distortion of the vertical temperature profile from a linear one.

The model was developed with the assistance of Ellen Fetter, who performed the numerical simulations and created the figures, and Margaret Hamilton, who aided in the initial computations. The behavior of these three variables is governed by the following equations whose values change over time, which is defined as t:
$$\begin{align}
\frac{\mathrm{d}x}{\mathrm{d}t} &= \sigma (y - x), \\
\frac{\mathrm{d}y}{\mathrm{d}t} &= x (\rho - z) - y, \\
\frac{\mathrm{d}z}{\mathrm{d}t} &= x y - \beta z.
\end{align}$$

The constants σ, ρ, and β are parameters representing physical properties of the system: σ is the Prandtl number, ρ is the Rayleigh number, and β relates to the physical dimensions of the fluid layer itself.

From a technical standpoint, the Lorenz system is nonlinear, aperiodic, three-dimensional, and deterministic. While originally for weather, the equations have since been found to model behavior in a wide variety of systems, including lasers, dynamos, electric circuits, and even some chemical reactions. The Lorenz equations have been the subject of hundreds of research articles and at least one book-length study.

== Analysis ==
One normally assumes that the parameters σ, ρ, and β are positive. Lorenz used the values σ = 10, ρ = 28, and β = 8/3. The system exhibits chaotic behavior for these (and nearby) values.

If ρ < 1, then there is only one equilibrium point, which is at the origin. This point corresponds to no convection. All orbits converge to the origin, which is a global attractor, when ρ < 1.

A pitchfork bifurcation occurs at ρ = 1, and for ρ > 1 two additional equilibrium points appear at
$$\left( \sqrt{\beta(\rho - 1)}, \sqrt{\beta(\rho - 1)}, \rho - 1 \right)
\quad \text{and} \quad
\left( -\sqrt{\beta(\rho - 1)}, -\sqrt{\beta(\rho - 1)}, \rho - 1 \right).$$
These correspond to steady convection. This pair of equilibrium points is stable only if
$$\rho < \sigma \frac{\sigma + \beta + 3}{\sigma - \beta - 1},$$
which can hold only for positive ρ if σ > β + 1. At the critical value, both equilibrium points lose stability through a subcritical Hopf bifurcation.

When ρ = 28, σ = 10, and β = 8/3, the Lorenz system has chaotic solutions (but not all solutions are chaotic). Almost all initial points will tend to an invariant set – the Lorenz attractor – a strange attractor, a fractal, and a self-excited attractor with respect to all three equilibria. Its Hausdorff dimension is estimated from above by the Lyapunov dimension (Kaplan-Yorke dimension) as 2.06±0.01, and the correlation dimension is estimated to be 2.05±0.01. The exact Lyapunov dimension formula of the global attractor can be found analytically under classical restrictions on the parameters:
$$3 - \frac{2(\sigma + \beta + 1)}{\sigma + 1 + \sqrt{(\sigma - 1)^2 + 4 \sigma \rho}}.$$

The Lorenz attractor is difficult to analyze, but the action of the differential equation on the attractor is described by a fairly simple geometric model. Proving that this is indeed the case is the fourteenth problem on the list of Smale's problems. This problem was the first one to be resolved, by Warwick Tucker in 2002.

For other values of ρ, the system displays knotted periodic orbits. For example, with ρ = 99.96 it becomes a T(3, 2) torus knot.

Example solutions of the Lorenz system for different values of ρ

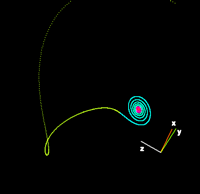
ρ = 14, σ = 10, β = 8/3

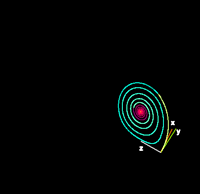
ρ = 13, σ = 10, β = 8/3

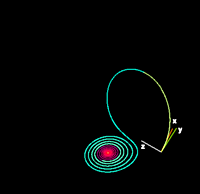
ρ = 15, σ = 10, β = 8/3

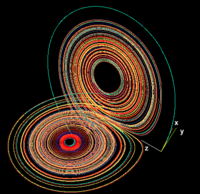
ρ = 28, σ = 10, β = 8/3

For small values of ρ, the system is stable and evolves to one- of two-fixed-point attractors. When ρ > 24.74, the fixed points become repulsors, and the trajectory is repelled by them in a very complex way.

These figures – made using ρ = 28, σ = 10, and β = 8/3 – show three time segments of the 3-dimensional evolution of two trajectories (one in blue, the other in yellow) in the Lorenz attractor starting at two initial points that differ only by 10^{−5} in the x coordinate:

Sensitive dependence on the initial condition

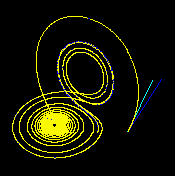
Time t = 1

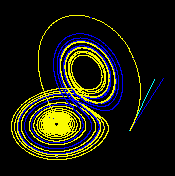
Time t = 2

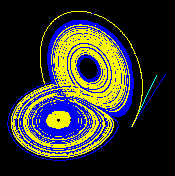
Time t = 3

Initially, the two trajectories seem coincident (only the yellow one can be seen, as it is drawn over the blue one) but, after some time, the divergence is obvious.

In this animation the equation is numerically integrated using a Runge–Kutta routine – made using starting from three initial conditions (0.9, 0, 0) (green), (1.0, 0, 0) (blue) and (1.1, 0, 0) (red):

Divergent evolution of three initially nearby trajectories

The parameters are: ρ = 28, σ = 10, and β = 8/3. Significant divergence is seen at around t = 24.0, beyond which the trajectories become uncorrelated.

== Connection to the tent map ==
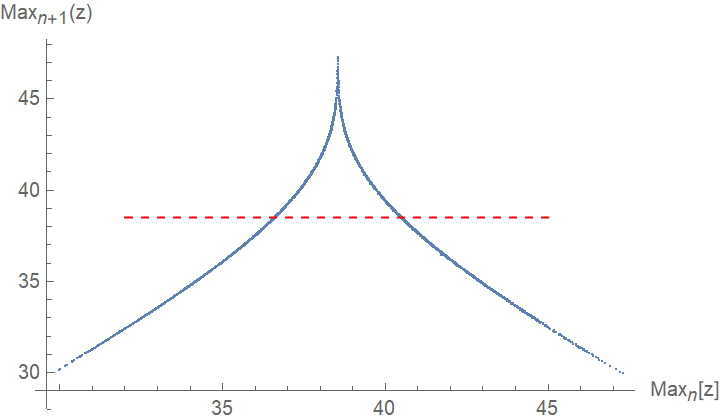
A recreation of Lorenz's results created on Mathematica. Points above the red line correspond to the system switching lobes.

In Figure 4 of his paper, Lorenz plotted the relative maximum value in the z direction achieved by the system against the previous relative maximum in the z direction. This procedure later became known as a Lorenz map (not to be confused with a Poincaré plot, which plots the intersections of a trajectory with a prescribed surface). The resulting plot has a shape very similar to the tent map. Lorenz also found that when the maximum z value is above a certain cut-off, the system will switch to the next lobe. Combining this with the chaos known to be exhibited by the tent map, he showed that the system switches between the two lobes chaotically.

== Simulations ==
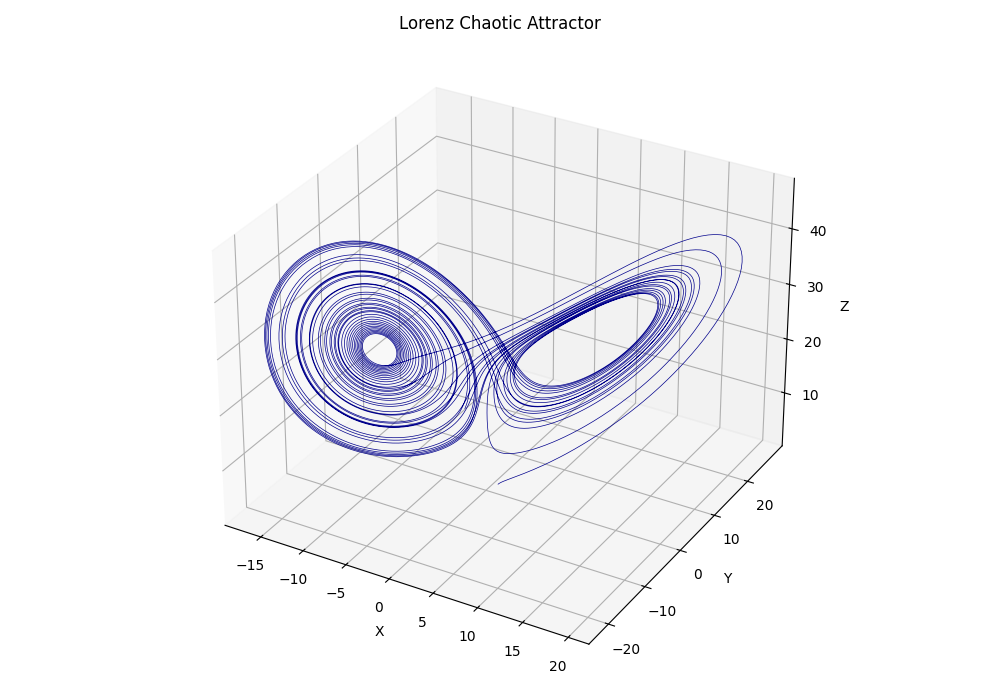
A plot of the 3D simulation

Julia simulation

=== Julia simulation ===
using GLMakie

Base.@kwdef mutable struct Lorenz
    dt::Float64 = 0.01
    σ::Float64 = 10
    ρ::Float64 = 28
    β::Float64 = 8/3
    x::Float64 = 1
    y::Float64 = 1
    z::Float64 = 1
end

function step!(l::Lorenz)
    dx = l.σ * (l.y - l.x)
    dy = l.x * (l.ρ - l.z) - l.y
    dz = l.x * l.y - l.β * l.z
    l.x += l.dt * dx
    l.y += l.dt * dy
    l.z += l.dt * dz
    Point3f(l.x, l.y, l.z)
end

attractor = Lorenz()

points = Point3f[]
colors = Int[]

set_theme!(theme_black())

fig, ax, l = lines(points, color = colors,
    colormap = :inferno, transparency = true,
    axis = (; type = Axis3, protrusions = (0, 0, 0, 0),
              viewmode = :fit, limits = (-30, 30, -30, 30, 0, 50)))

record(fig, "lorenz.gif", 1:120) do frame
    for i in 1:50
        push!(points, step!(attractor))
        push!(colors, frame)
    end
    ax.azimuth[] = 1.7pi + 0.3 * sin(2pi * frame / 120)
    Makie.update!(l, arg1 = points, color = colors) # Makie 0.24+
    l.colorrange = (0, frame)
end

=== Maple simulation ===
deq := [diff(x(t), t) = 10*(y(t) - x(t)), diff(y(t), t) = 28*x(t) - y(t) - x(t)*z(t), diff(z(t), t) = x(t)*y(t) - 8/3*z(t)]:
with(DEtools):
DEplot3d(deq, {x(t), y(t), z(t)}, t = 0 .. 100, [[x(0) = 10, y(0) = 10, z(0) = 10]], stepsize = 0.01, x = -20 .. 20, y = -25 .. 25, z = 0 .. 50, linecolour = sin(t*Pi/3), thickness = 1, orientation = [-40, 80], title = `Lorenz Chaotic Attractor`);

=== Maxima simulation ===
[sigma, rho, beta]: [10, 28, 8/3]$
eq: [sigma*(y-x), x*(rho-z)-y, x*y-beta*z]$
sol: rk(eq, [x, y, z], [1, 0, 0], [t, 0, 50, 1/100])$
len: length(sol)$
x: makelist(sol[k][2], k, len)$
y: makelist(sol[k][3], k, len)$
z: makelist(sol[k][4], k, len)$
draw3d(points_joined=true, point_type=-1, points(x, y, z), proportional_axes=xyz)$

=== MATLAB simulation ===
% Solve over time interval [0,100] with initial conditions [1,1,1]
% ''f'' is set of differential equations
% ''a'' is array containing x, y, and z variables
% ''t'' is time variable

sigma = 10;
beta = 8/3;
rho = 28;
f = @(t,a) [-sigma*a(1) + sigma*a(2); rho*a(1) - a(2) - a(1)*a(3); -beta*a(3) + a(1)*a(2)];
[t,a] = ode45(f,[0 100],[1 1 1]);     % Runge-Kutta 4th/5th order ODE solver
plot3(a(:,1),a(:,2),a(:,3))

=== Mathematica simulation ===
Standard way:

tend = 50;
eq = {x'[t] == σ (y[t] - x[t]), 
      y'[t] == x[t] (ρ - z[t]) - y[t], 
      z'[t] == x[t] y[t] - β z[t]};
init = {x[0] == 10, y[0] == 10, z[0] == 10};
pars = {σ->10, ρ->28, β->8/3};
{xs, ys, zs} = 
  NDSolveValue[{eq /. pars, init}, {x, y, z}, {t, 0, tend}];
ParametricPlot3D[{xs[t], ys[t], zs[t]}, {t, 0, tend}]

Less verbose:

lorenz = NonlinearStateSpaceModel[{{σ (y - x), x (ρ - z) - y, x y - β z}, {}}, {x, y, z}, {σ, ρ, β}];
soln[t_] = StateResponse[{lorenz, {10, 10, 10}}, {10, 28, 8/3}, {t, 0, 50}];
ParametricPlot3D[soln[t], {t, 0, 50}]

=== R simulation ===
library(deSolve)
library(plotly)

# parameters
prm <- list(sigma = 10, rho = 28, beta = 8/3)

# initial values
varini <- c(
  X = 1,
  Y = 1, 
  Z = 1
)

Lorenz <- function (t, vars, prm) {
  with(as.list(vars), {
    dX <- prm$sigma*(Y - X)
    dY <- X*(prm$rho - Z) - Y
    dZ <- X*Y - prm$beta*Z
    return(list(c(dX, dY, dZ)))
   })
}

times <- seq(from = 0, to = 100, by = 0.01)

# call ODE solver
out <- ode(y = varini, times = times, func = Lorenz,
           parms = prm)

# to assign color to points
gfill <- function (repArr, long) {
  rep(repArr, ceiling(long/length(repArr)))[1:long]
}

dout <- as.data.frame(out)
dout$color <- gfill(rainbow(10), nrow(dout))

# Graphics production with Plotly:
plot_ly(
  data=dout, x = ~X, y = ~Y, z = ~Z,
  type = 'scatter3d', mode = 'lines',
  opacity = 1, line = list(width = 6, color = ~color, reverscale = FALSE)
)

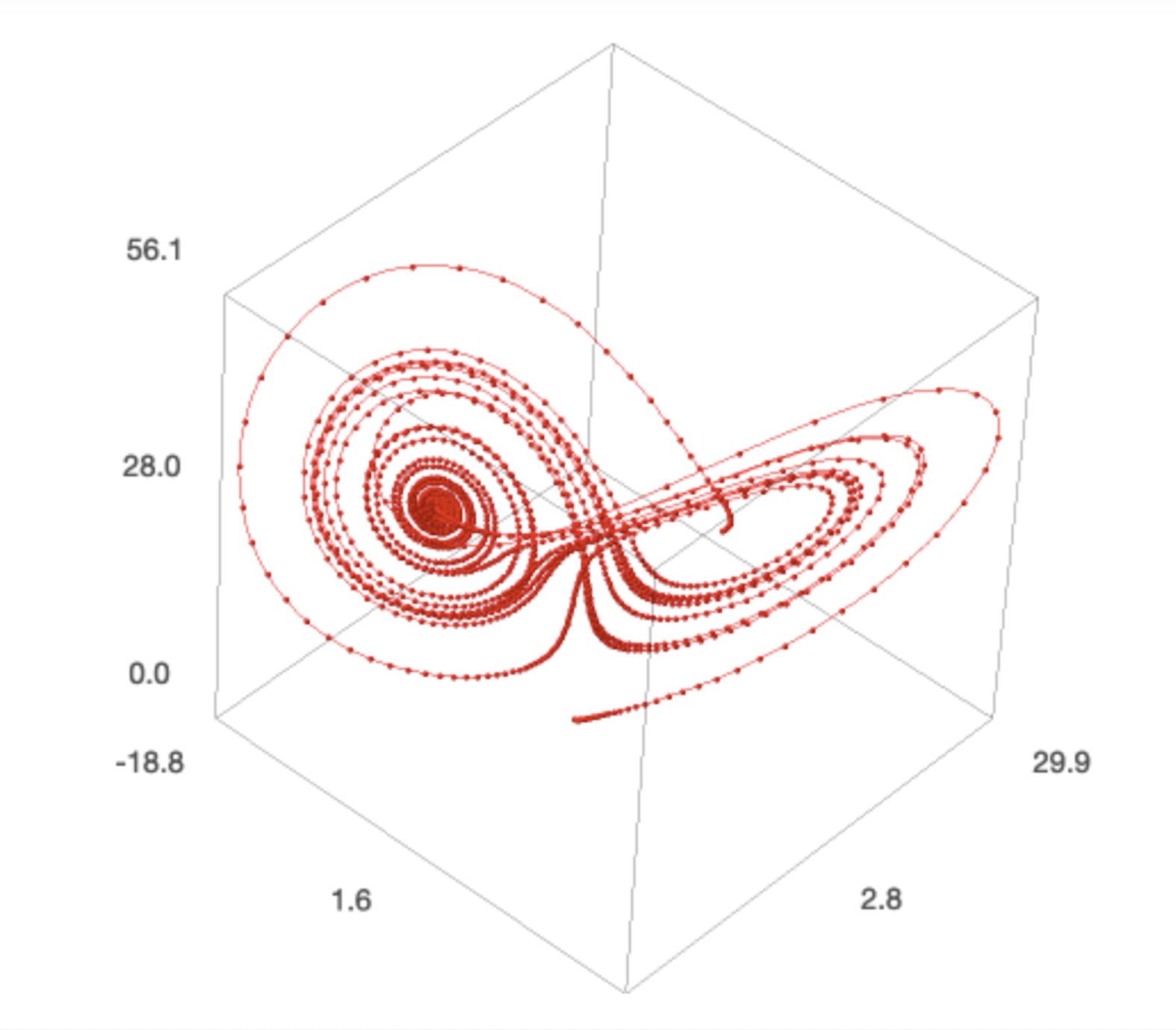
Plotting solutions of the Lorenz ODE system

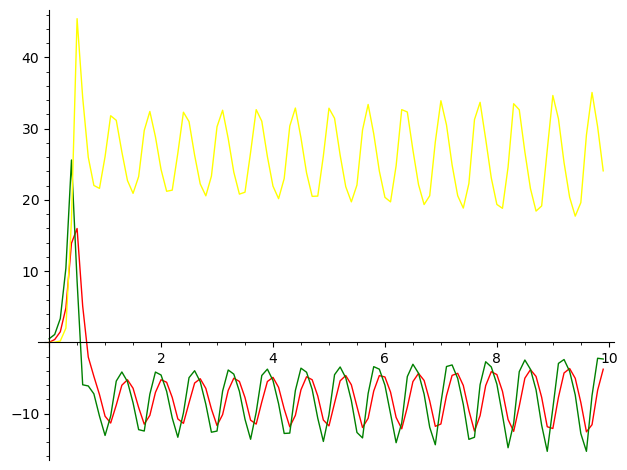
Plotting every y_{1}, y_{2}, y_{3} in terms of time t

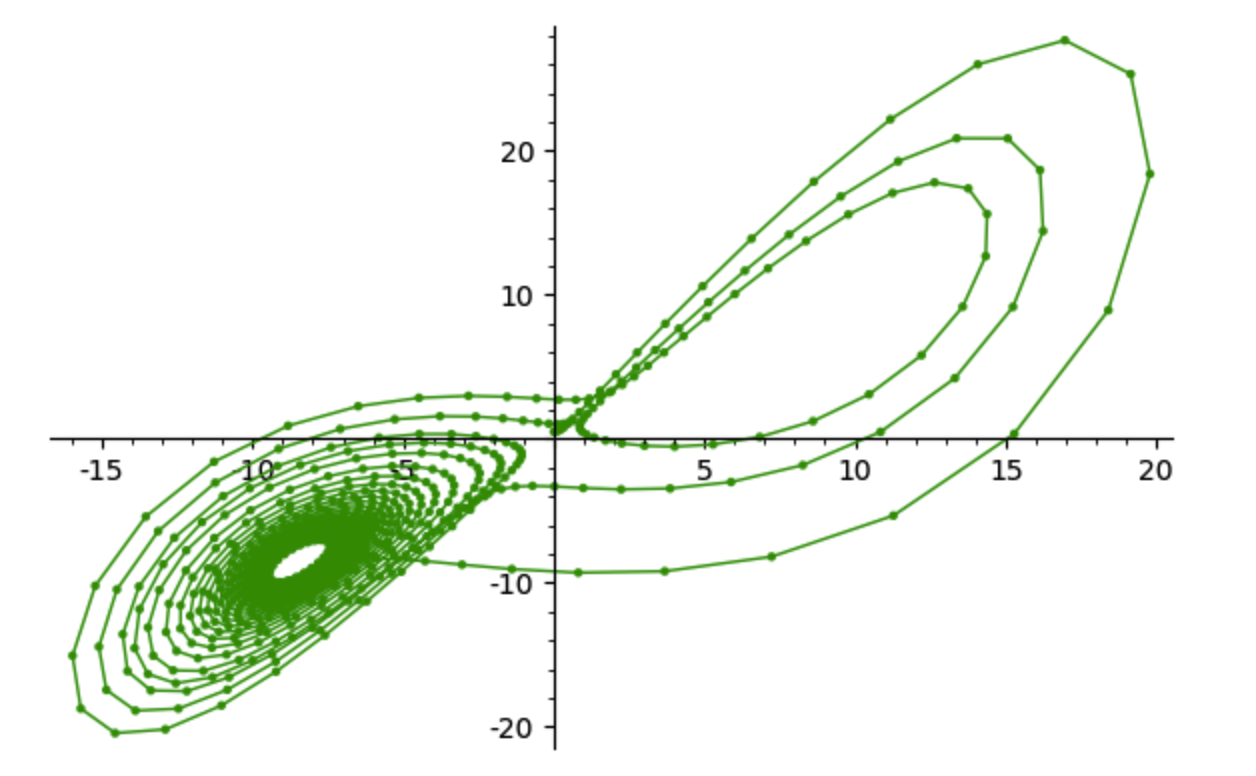
Plotting y against x, or equivalently y_{2} against y_{1}

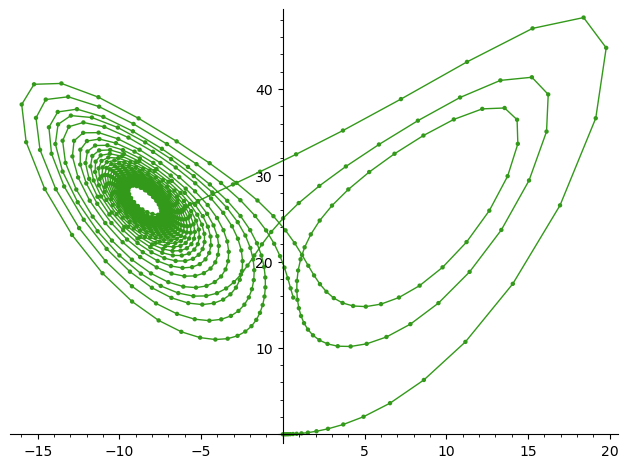
Plotting z against x, or equivalently y_{3} against y_{1}

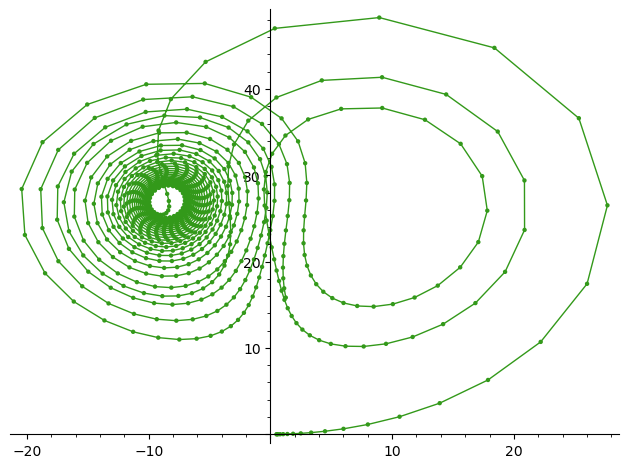
Plotting z against y, or equivalently y_{3} against y_{2}

=== SageMath simulation ===
# we solve the Lorenz system of differential equations with initial conditions y_1(0) = 0, y_2(0) = 0.5, y_3(0) = 0.
# Runge-Kutta's method y_{n+1}= y_n + h*(k_1 + 2*k_2+2*k_3+k_4)/6; x_{n+1}=x_n+h
# k_1=f(x_n,y_n), k_2=f(x_n+h/2, y_n+hk_1/2), k_3=f(x_n+h/2, y_n+hk_2/2), k_4=f(x_n+h, y_n+hk_3)
# differential equation

def Runge_Kutta(f,v,a,b,h,n):
    tlist = [a+i*h for i in range(n+1)]
    y = [[0,0,0] for _ in range(n+1)]
    # Taking length of f (number of equations).
    m=len(f)
    # Number of variables in v.
    vm=len(v)
    if m!=vm:
        return("error, number of equations is not equal with the number of variables.")
    for r in range(vm):
        y[0][r]=b[r]
    # making a vector and component will be a list    
    # main part of the algorithm    
    k1=[0 for _ in range(m)]
    k2=[0 for _ in range(m)]
    k3=[0 for _ in range(m)]
    k4=[0 for _ in range(m)]
    for i in range(1,n+1): # for each t_i, i=1, ... , n
        # k1=h*f(t_{i-1},x_1(t_{i-1}),...,x_m(t_{i-1}))
        for j in range(m): # for each f_{j+1}, j=0, ... , m-1
            k1[j]=f[j].subs(t==tlist[i-1])
            for r in range(vm):
                k1[j]=k1[j].subs(v[r]==y[i-1][r])
            k1[j]=h*k1[j]
        for j in range(m): # k2=h*f(t_{i-1}+h/2,x_1(t_{i-1})+k1/2,...,x_m(t_{i-1}+k1/2))
            k2[j]=f[j].subs(t==tlist[i-1]+h/2)
            for r in range(vm):
                k2[j]=k2[j].subs(v[r]==y[i-1][r]+k1[r]/2)
            k2[j]=h*k2[j]
        for j in range(m): # k3=h*f(t_{i-1}+h/2,x_1(t_{i-1})+k2/2,...,x_m(t_{i-1})+k2/2)
            k3[j]=f[j].subs(t==tlist[i-1]+h/2)
            for r in range(vm):
                k3[j]=k3[j].subs(v[r]==y[i-1][r]+k2[r]/2)
            k3[j]=h*k3[j]
        for j in range(m): # k4=h*f(t_{i-1}+h,x_1(t_{i-1})+k3,...,x_m(t_{i-1})+k3)
            k4[j]=f[j].subs(t==tlist[i-1]+h)
            for r in range(vm):
                k4[j]=k4[j].subs(v[r]==y[i-1][r]+k3[r])
            k4[j]=h*k4[j]
        for j in range(m): # Now x_j(t_i)=x_j(t_{i-1})+(k1+2k2+2k3+k4)/6
            y[i][j]=y[i-1][j]+(k1[j]+2*k2[j]+2*k3[j]+k4[j])/6
    return(tlist,y)

# (Figure 1) Here, we plot the solutions of the Lorenz ODE system. 
a=0.0 # t_0
b=[0.0,.50,0.0] # x_1(t_0), ... , x_m(t_0)
t=var('t')
x = var('x', n=3, latex_name='x')
v=[x[ii] for ii in range(3)]
f= [10*(x1-x0),x0*(28-x2)-x1,x0*x1-(8/3)*x2];
n=1600
h=0.0125
tlist,y=Runge_Kutta(f,v,a,b,h,n)
#print(tlist)
#print(y)
T=point3d([[y[i][0],y[i][1],y[i][2]] for i in range(n)], color='red')
S=line3d([[y[i][0],y[i][1],y[i][2]] for i in range(n)], color='red')
show(T+S)

# (Figure 2) Here, we plot every y1, y2, and y3 in terms of time.
a=0.0 # t_0
b=[0.0,.50,0.0] # x_1(t_0), ... , x_m(t_0)
t=var('t')
x = var('x', n=3, latex_name='x')
v=[x[ii] for ii in range(3)]
Lorenz= [10*(x1-x0),x0*(28-x2)-x1,x0*x1-(8/3)*x2];
n=100
h=0.1
tlist,y=Runge_Kutta(Lorenz,v,a,b,h,n)
#Runge_Kutta(f,v,0,b,h,n)
#print(tlist)
#print(y)
P1=list_plot([[tlist[i],y[i][0]] for i in range(n)], plotjoined=True, color='red');
P2=list_plot([[tlist[i],y[i][1]] for i in range(n)], plotjoined=True, color='green');
P3=list_plot([[tlist[i],y[i][2]] for i in range(n)], plotjoined=True, color='yellow');
show(P1+P2+P3)

# (Figure 3) Here, we plot the y and x or equivalently y2 and y1 
a=0.0 # t_0
b=[0.0,.50,0.0] # x_1(t_0), ... , x_m(t_0)
t=var('t')
x = var('x', n=3, latex_name='x')
v=[x[ii] for ii in range(3)]
f= [10*(x1-x0),x0*(28-x2)-x1,x0*x1-(8/3)*x2];
n=800
h=0.025
tlist,y=Runge_Kutta(f,v,a,b,h,n)
vv=[[y[i][0],y[i][1]] for i in range(n)];
#print(tlist)
#print(y)
T=points(vv, rgbcolor=(0.2,0.6, 0.1), pointsize=10)
S=line(vv,rgbcolor=(0.2,0.6, 0.1))
show(T+S)

# (Figure 4) Here, we plot the z and x or equivalently y3 and y1 
a=0.0 # t_0
b=[0.0,.50,0.0] # x_1(t_0), ... , x_m(t_0)
t=var('t')
x = var('x', n=3, latex_name='x')
v=[x[ii] for ii in range(3)]
f= [10*(x1-x0),x0*(28-x2)-x1,x0*x1-(8/3)*x2];
n=800
h=0.025
tlist,y=Runge_Kutta(f,v,a,b,h,n)
vv=[[y[i][0],y[i][2]] for i in range(n)];
#print(tlist)
#print(y)
T=points(vv, rgbcolor=(0.2,0.6, 0.1), pointsize=10)
S=line(vv,rgbcolor=(0.2,0.6, 0.1))
show(T+S)

# (Figure 5) Here, we plot the z and x or equivalently y3 and y2 
a=0.0 # t_0
b=[0.0,.50,0.0] # x_1(t_0), ... , x_m(t_0)
t=var('t')
x = var('x', n=3, latex_name='x')
v=[x[ii] for ii in range(3)]
f= [10*(x1-x0),x0*(28-x2)-x1,x0*x1-(8/3)*x2];
n=800
h=0.025
tlist,y=Runge_Kutta(f,v,a,b,h,n)
vv=[[y[i][1],y[i][2]] for i in range(n)];
#print(tlist)
#print(y)
T=points(vv, rgbcolor=(0.2,0.6, 0.1), pointsize=10)
S=line(vv,rgbcolor=(0.2,0.6, 0.1))
show(T+S)

== Applications ==
=== Model for atmospheric convection ===
As shown in Lorenz's original paper, the Lorenz system is a reduced version of a larger system studied earlier by Barry Saltzman. The Lorenz equations are derived from the Oberbeck–Boussinesq approximation to the equations describing fluid circulation in a shallow layer of fluid, heated uniformly from below and cooled uniformly from above. This fluid circulation is known as Rayleigh–Bénard convection. The fluid is assumed to circulate in two dimensions (vertical and horizontal) with periodic rectangular boundary conditions.

The partial differential equations modeling the system's stream function and temperature are subjected to a spectral Galerkin approximation: the hydrodynamic fields are expanded in Fourier series, which are then severely truncated to a single term for the stream function and two terms for the temperature. This reduces the model equations to a set of three coupled, nonlinear ordinary differential equations. A detailed derivation may be found, for example, in nonlinear dynamics texts from Hilborn (2000), Appendix C; Bergé, Pomeau & Vidal (1984), Appendix D; or Shen (2016), Supplementary Materials.

=== Model for the nature of chaos and order in the atmosphere ===
The scientific community accepts that the chaotic features found in low-dimensional Lorenz models could represent features of the Earth's atmosphere, yielding the statement of "weather is chaotic." By comparison, based on the concept of attractor coexistence within the generalized Lorenz model and the original Lorenz model, Shen and his co-authors proposed a revised view that "weather possesses both chaos and order with distinct predictability". The revised view, which is a build-up of the conventional view, is used to suggest that "the chaotic and regular features found in theoretical Lorenz models could better represent features of the Earth's atmosphere".

=== Resolution of Smale's 14th problem ===
Smale's 14th problem asks, "Do the properties of the Lorenz attractor exhibit that of a strange attractor?". The problem was answered affirmatively by Warwick Tucker in 2002. To prove this result, Tucker used rigorous numerics methods like interval arithmetic and normal forms. First, Tucker defined a cross section $\Sigma\subset \{x_3 = r - 1 \}$ that is cut transversely by the flow trajectories. From this, one can define the first-return map $P$, which assigns to each $x\in\Sigma$ the point $P(x)$ where the trajectory of $x$ first intersects $\Sigma$.

Then the proof is split in three main points that are proved and imply the existence of a strange attractor. The three points are:

- There exists a region $N\subset\Sigma$ invariant under the first-return map, meaning $P(N)\subset N$.
- The return map admits a forward invariant cone field.
- Vectors inside this invariant cone field are uniformly expanded by the derivative $DP$ of the return map.

To prove the first point, we notice that the cross section $\Sigma$ is cut by two arcs formed by $P(\Sigma)$. Tucker covers the location of these two arcs by small rectangles $R_i$, the union of these rectangles gives $N$. Now, the goal is to prove that for all points in $N$, the flow will bring back the points in $\Sigma$, in $N$. To do that, we take a plan $\Sigma'$ below $\Sigma$ at a distance $h$ small, then by taking the center $c_i$ of $R_i$ and using Euler integration method, one can estimate where the flow will bring $c_i$ in $\Sigma'$ which gives us a new point $c_i'$. Then, one can estimate where the points in $\Sigma$ will be mapped in $\Sigma'$ using Taylor expansion, this gives us a new rectangle $R_i'$ centered on $c_i$. Thus we know that all points in $R_i$ will be mapped in $R_i'$. The goal is to do this method recursively until the flow comes back to $\Sigma$ and we obtain a rectangle $Rf_i$ in $\Sigma$ such that we know that $P(R_i)\subset Rf_i$. The problem is that our estimation may become imprecise after several iterations, thus what Tucker does is to split $R_i'$ into smaller rectangles $R_{i,j}$ and then apply the process recursively. Another problem is that as we are applying this algorithm, the flow becomes more 'horizontal', leading to a dramatic increase in imprecision. To prevent this, the algorithm changes the orientation of the cross sections, becoming either horizontal or vertical.

== Gallery ==
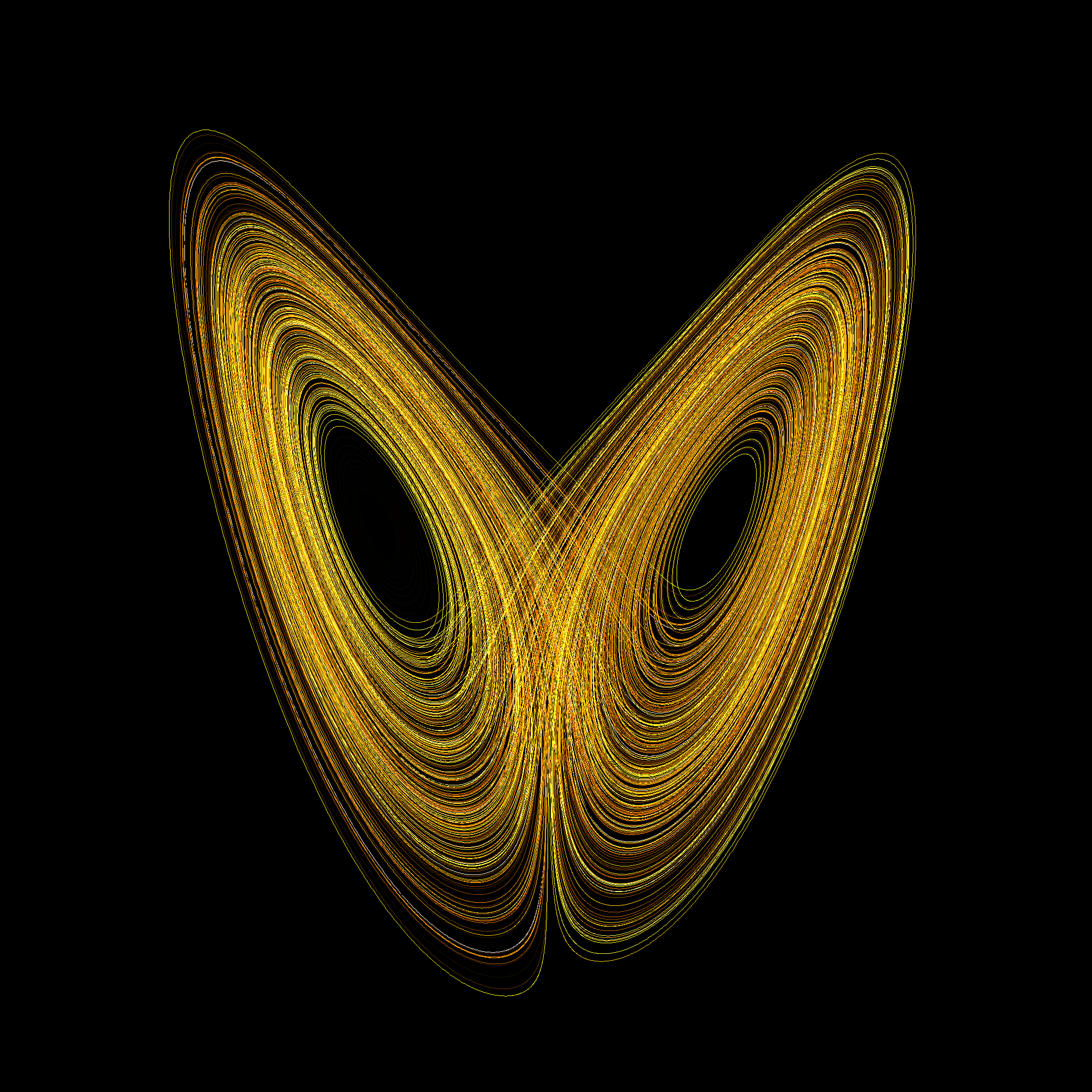
A solution in the Lorenz attractor plotted at high resolution in the xz plane

A solution in the Lorenz attractor rendered as an SVG

An animation showing trajectories of multiple solutions in a Lorenz system

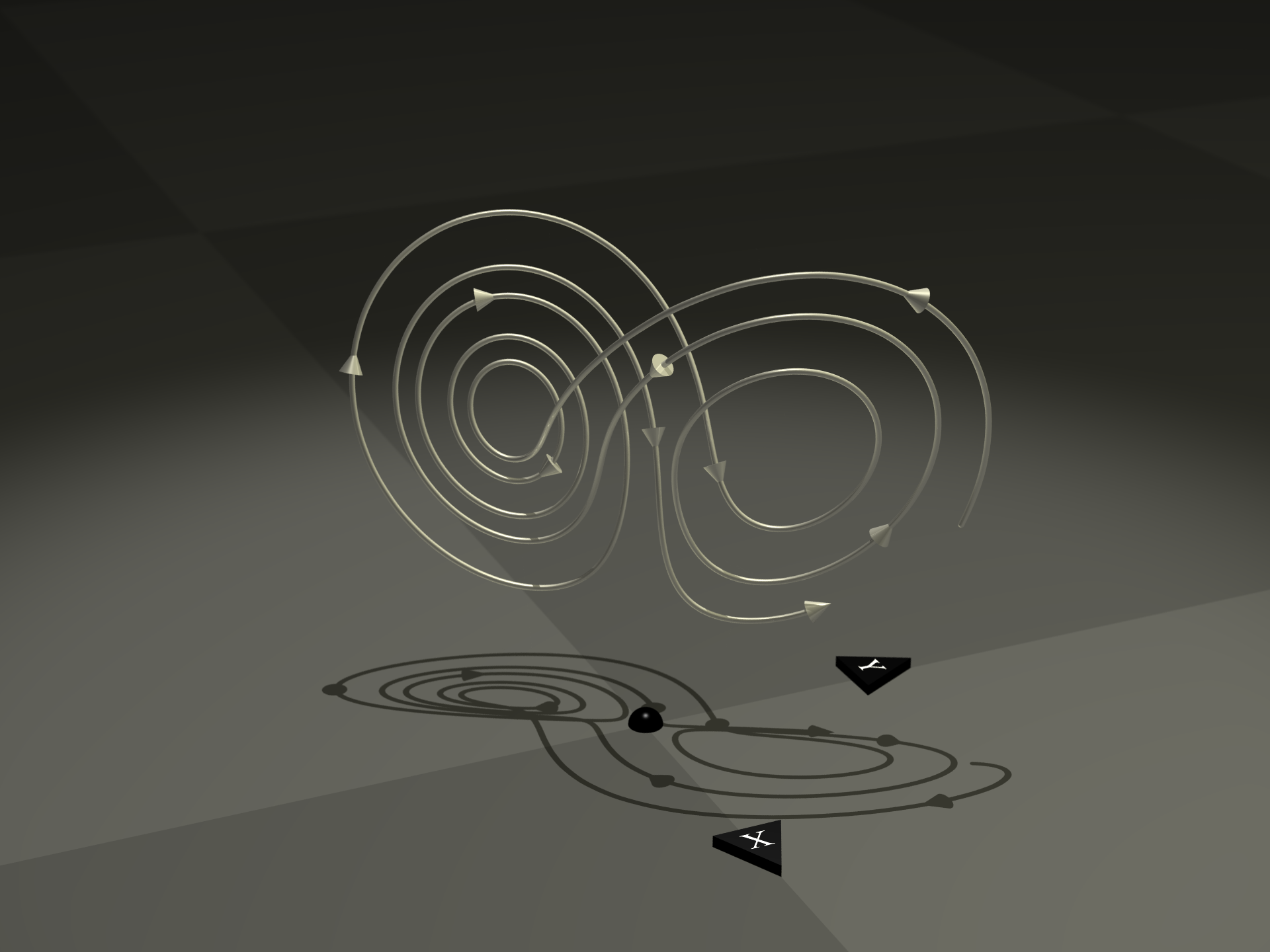
A solution in the Lorenz attractor rendered as a metal wire to show direction and 3D structure

An animation showing the divergence of nearby solutions to the Lorenz system

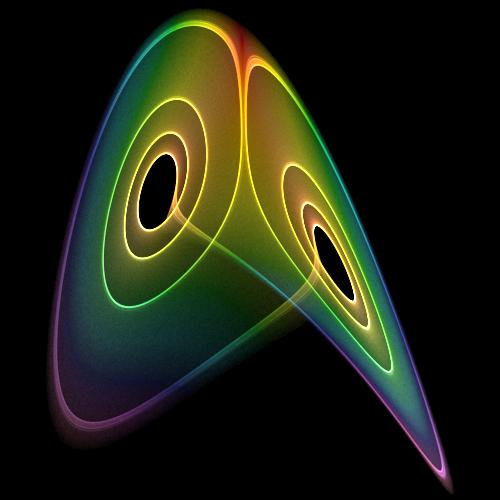
A visualization of the Lorenz attractor near an intermittent cycle

Two streamlines in a Lorenz system, from ρ = 0 to ρ = 28 (σ = 10, β = 8/3)

Animation of a Lorenz System with ρ-dependence

Animation of the Lorenz attractor in the Brain Dynamics Toolbox

== See also ==
- Eden's conjecture on the Lyapunov dimension
- Lorenz 96 model
- List of chaotic maps
- Takens' theorem
