= Hidden attractor =

In the bifurcation theory, a bounded oscillation that is born without loss of stability of stationary set is called a hidden oscillation. In nonlinear control theory, the birth of a hidden oscillation in a time-invariant control system with bounded states means crossing a boundary, in the domain of the parameters, where local stability of the stationary states implies global stability (see, e.g. Kalman's conjecture). If a hidden oscillation (or a set of such hidden oscillations filling a compact subset of the phase space of the dynamical system) attracts all nearby oscillations, then it is called a hidden attractor. For a dynamical system with a unique equilibrium point that is globally attractive, the birth of a hidden attractor corresponds to a qualitative change in behaviour from monostability to bi-stability. In the general case, a dynamical system may turn out to be multistable and have coexisting local attractors in the phase space. While trivial attractors, i.e. stable equilibrium points, can be easily found analytically or numerically, the search of periodic and chaotic attractors can turn out to be a challenging problem (see, e.g. the second part of Hilbert's 16th problem).

== Classification of attractors as being hidden or self-excited ==
To identify a local attractor in a physical or numerical experiment, one needs to choose an initial system’s state in attractor’s basin of attraction and observe how the system’s state, starting from this initial state, after a transient process, visualizes the attractor. The classification of attractors as being hidden or self-excited reflects the difficulties of revealing basins of attraction and searching for the local attractors in the phase space.

Definition. An attractor is called a hidden attractor if its basin of attraction does not intersect with a certain open neighbourhood of equilibrium points; otherwise it is called a self-excited attractor.

The classification of attractors as being hidden or self-excited was introduced by G. Leonov and N. Kuznetsov in connection with the discovery of the hidden Chua attractor for the first time in 2009. Similarly, an arbitrary bounded oscillation, not necessarily having an open neighborhood as the basin of attraction in the phase space, is classified as a self-excited or hidden oscillation.

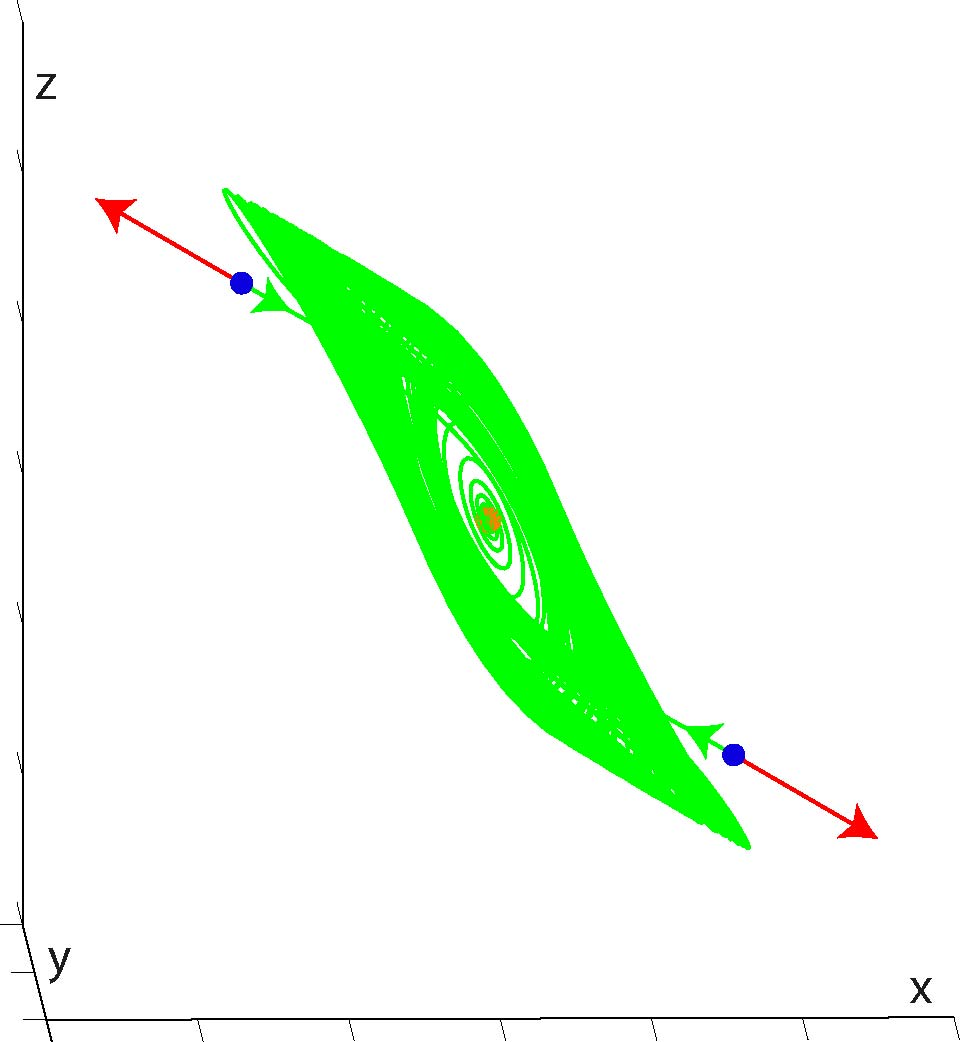
Chaotic self-excited attractor (green domain) in Chua's system. Trajectories with initial data in neighborhoods of two saddle points (blue) and zero equilibrium point (orange) tend (green) to attractor.

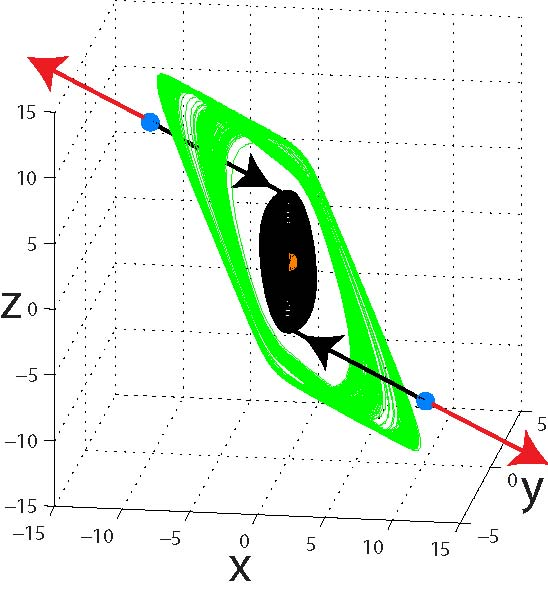
Chaotic hidden attractor (green domain) in Chua's system. Trajectories with initial data in neighborhoods of two saddle points (blue) tend (red arrow) to infinity or tend (black arrow) to stable zero equilibrium point (orange).

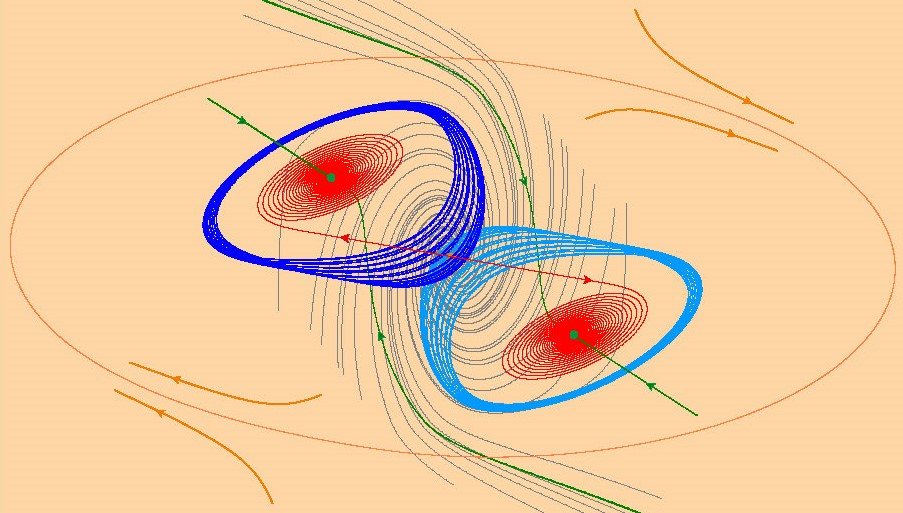
Two hidden chaotic attractors and one hidden periodic attractor coexist with two trivial attractors in Chua circuit (from the cover of IJBC)

=== Self-excited attractors ===
For a self-excited attractor, its basin of attraction is connected with an unstable equilibrium and, therefore, the self-excited attractors can be found numerically by a standard computational procedure in which after a transient process, a trajectory, starting in a neighbourhood of an unstable equilibrium, is attracted to the state of oscillation and then traces it (see, e.g. self-oscillation process). Thus, self-excited attractors, even coexisting in the case of multistability, can be easily revealed and visualized numerically. In the Lorenz system, for classical parameters, the attractor is self-excited with respect to all existing equilibria, and can be visualized by any trajectory from their vicinities; however, for some other parameter values there are two trivial attractors coexisting with a chaotic attractor, which is a self-excited one with respect to the zero equilibrium only. Classical attractors in Van der Pol, Beluosov–Zhabotinsky, Rössler, Chua, Hénon dynamical systems are self-excited.

A conjecture is that the Lyapunov dimension of a self-excited attractor does not exceed the Lyapunov dimension of one of the unstable equilibria, the unstable manifold of which intersects with the basin of attraction and visualizes the attractor.

=== Hidden attractors ===
Hidden attractors have basins of attraction which are not connected with equilibria and are “hidden” somewhere in the phase space. For example, the hidden attractors are attractors in the systems without equilibria: e.g. rotating electromechanical dynamical systems with the Sommerfeld effect (1902), in systems with only one equilibrium, which is stable e.g. the counterexamples to Aizerman's conjecture (1949) and Kalman's conjecture (1957) on the monostability of nonlinear control systems. One of the first related theoretical problems is the second part of Hilbert's 16th problem on the number and mutual disposition of limit cycles in two-dimensional polynomial systems where the nested stable limit cycles are hidden periodic attractors. The notion of a hidden attractor has become a catalyst for the discovery of hidden attractors in many applied dynamical models.

In general, the problem with hidden attractors is that there are no general straightforward methods to trace or predict such states for the system’s dynamics (see, e.g.). While for two-dimensional systems, hidden oscillations can be investigated using analytical methods (see, e.g., the results on the second part of Hilbert's 16th problem), for the study of stability and oscillations in complex nonlinear multidimensional systems, numerical methods are often used. In the multi-dimensional case the integration of trajectories with random initial data is unlikely to provide a localization of a hidden attractor, since a basin of attraction may be very small, and the attractor dimension itself may be much less than the dimension of the considered system. Therefore, for the numerical localization of hidden attractors in multi-dimensional space, it is necessary to develop special analytical-numerical computational procedures, which allow one to choose initial data in the attraction domain of the hidden oscillation (which does not contain neighborhoods of equilibria), and then to perform trajectory computation. There are corresponding effective methods based on homotopy and numerical continuation: a sequence of similar systems is constructed, such that for the first (starting) system, the initial data for numerical computation of an oscillating solution (starting oscillation) can be obtained analytically, and then the transformation of this starting oscillation in the transition from one system to another is followed numerically.

== Theory of hidden oscillations ==
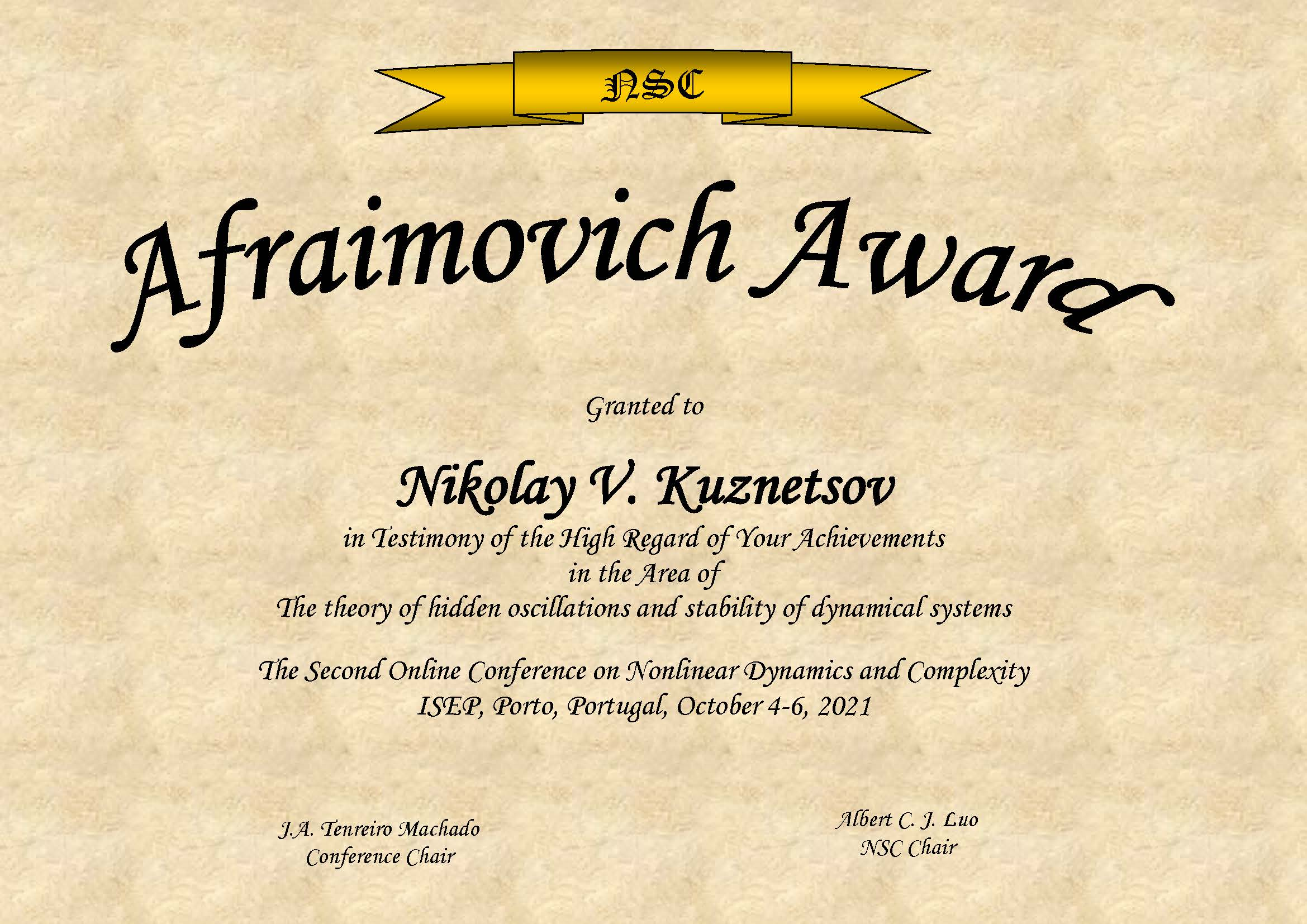
Afraimovich Award granted to N. Kuznetsov for The theory of hidden oscillations and stability of dynamical systems (2021)

The classification of attractors as self-exited or hidden ones was a fundamental premise for the emergence of the theory of hidden oscillations, a modern development of Andronov’s theory of oscillations. It is key to determining the exact boundaries of the global stability, parts of which are classified by N. Kuznetsov as trivial (i.e., determined by local bifurcations) or as hidden (i.e., determined by non-local bifurcations and by the birth of hidden oscillations).

== Books ==
- Chaotic Systems with Multistability and Hidden Attractors (Eds.: Wang, Kuznetsov, Chen), Springer, 2021 (doi:10.1007/978-3-030-75821-9)
- Nonlinear Dynamical Systems with Self-Excited and Hidden Attractors (Eds.: Pham, Vaidyanathan, Volos et al.), Springer, 2018 (doi:10.1007/978-3-319-71243-7)

== Selected lectures ==
- N.Kuznetsov, Invited lecture The theory of hidden oscillations and stability of dynamical systems, Int. Workshop on Applied Mathematics, Czech Republic, 2021
- Afraimovich Award's plenary lecture: N. Kuznetsov The theory of hidden oscillations and stability of dynamical systems. Int. Conference on Nonlinear Dynamics and Complexity, 2021
