= Andronov Prize =

The Andronov Prize is a Soviet and Russian mathematics prize, awarded for outstanding works in the classical mechanics and control theory. It is named after the Soviet physicist and member of the Soviet Academy of Sciences Alexander Alexandrovich Andronov.

Between 1971 and 1990 the prize was awarded by the USSR Academy of Sciences. It was re-established by the Russian Academy of Sciences in 1993 and was awarded till 2024. It is generally awarded to a single scientist or a team of up to three scientists once every three years. The first prize in 1971 was awarded to Academician of the USSR Academy of Sciences V.V. Petrov for a series of works on control theory and the principles of constructing nonlinear systems and servomechanisms, the last prize in 2024 was awarded to Academician of the Russian Academy of Sciences N.V. Kuznetsov for a series of works on the theory of hidden oscillations and stability of control systems. In total, the prize was awarded 17 times (7 times to one laureate and 10 times to groups) and 32 scientists became laureates of the prize. Since 2024, the prize is no longer awarded due to reforms in the Russian Academy of Sciences.
