= Strange nonchaotic attractor =

Delay coordinate embedding attractor reconstruction of the strange nonchaotic dynamics of the pulsating star KIC 5520878

In mathematics, a strange nonchaotic attractor (SNA) is a form of attractor which, while converging to a limit, is strange, because it is not piecewise differentiable, and also non-chaotic, in that its Lyapunov exponents are non-positive. SNAs were introduced as a topic of study by Grebogi et al. in 1984. SNAs can be distinguished from periodic, quasiperiodic and chaotic attractors using the 0-1 test for chaos.

Periodically driven damped nonlinear systems can exhibit complex dynamics characterized by strange chaotic attractors, where strange refers to the fractal geometry of the attractor and chaotic refers to the exponential sensitivity of orbits on the attractor. Quasiperiodically driven systems forced by incommensurate frequencies are natural extensions of periodically driven ones and are phenomenologically richer. In addition to periodic or quasiperiodic motion, they can exhibit chaotic or nonchaotic motion on strange attractors. Although quasiperiodic forcing is not necessary for strange nonchaotic dynamics (e.g., the period doubling accumulation point of a period doubling cascade), if quasiperiodic driving is not present, strange nonchaotic attractors are typically not robust and not expected to occur naturally because they exist only when the system is carefully tuned to a precise critical parameter value. On the other hand, it was shown in the paper of Grebogi et al. that SNAs can be robust when the system is quasiperiodically driven. The first experiment to demonstrate a robust strange nonchaotic attractor involved the buckling of a magnetoelastic ribbon driven quasiperiodically by two incommensurate frequencies in the golden ratio. Strange nonchaotic attractors have been robustly observed in laboratory experiments involving magnetoelastic ribbons, electrochemical cells, electronic circuits, and a neon glow discharge. In 2015, strange nonchaotic dynamics were identified for the pulsating RR Lyrae variable KIC 5520878, as well as three similar stars observed by the Kepler space telescope, which oscillate in two frequency modes that are nearly in the golden ratio.
