= Sommerfeld effect =

Mechanical phenomenon

In mechanics, Sommerfeld effect is a phenomenon arising from feedback in the energy exchange between vibrating systems: for example, when for the rocking table, under given conditions, energy transmitted to the motor resulted not in higher revolutions but in stronger vibrations of the table. It is named after Arnold Sommerfeld. In 1902, A. Sommerfeld analyzed the vibrations caused by a motor driving an unbalanced weight and wrote that "This experiment corresponds roughly to the case in which a factory owner has a machine set on a poor foundation running at 30 horsepower. He achieves an effective level of just 1/3, however, because only 10 horsepower are doing useful work, while 20 horsepower are transferred to the foundational masonry". First mathematical descriptions of Sommerfeld effect were suggested by I. Blekhman and V. Kononenko.

== Hidden attractors in Sommerfeld effect ==
In the theory of hidden oscillations, Sommerfeld effect is explained by the multistability and presence in the phase space of dynamical model without stationary states of two coexisting hidden attractors, one of which attracts trajectories from vicinity of zero initial data (which correspond to the typical start up of the motor), and the other attractor corresponds to the desired mode of operation with a higher frequency of rotation. Depending on the model under consideration, coexisting hidden attractors in the model may be either periodic or chaotic; such dynamical models with Sommerfeld effect are the earliest known mechanical example of a system without equilibria and with hidden attractors. For example, the Sommerfeld effect with hidden attractors can be observed in dynamic models of drilling rigs, where the electric motor may excite torsional vibrations of the drill.
