= Singapore National Academy =

Singapore National Academy is a school in Sidoarjo, Indonesia, near Lotte Mart and Giant.

It is an international school with a Singapore-based curriculum. Its students mainly speaks English, however, they are allowed to speak Chinese and Indonesian language in Chinese and Indonesian classes, respectively. Its classes include Chinese, English, PA, CCA, PE, Math, and Science.
