= Aleksandr Andronov =

Soviet Russian physicist

Aleksandr Aleksandrovich Andronov
- Алекса́ндр Алекса́ндрович Андро́нов
- Born: April 11, 1901; Moscow
- Died: October 31, 1952 (aged 51)
- Citizenship: Russian Empire, USSR
- Education: Moscow State University (1925)
- Scientific career
- Fields: physics
- Workplaces: UNN
- Doctoral advisor: Leonid Mandelstam
- Doctoral students: Dmitry Gudkov
- Other notable students: Andrey Gaponov-Grekhov

Aleksandr Aleksandrovich Andronov (Russian: Алекса́ндр Алекса́ндрович Андро́нов; 11 April [O.S. 29 March] 1901, Moscow – October 31, 1952, Gorky) was a Soviet physicist and member of the Soviet Academy of Sciences (1946). He worked extensively on the theory of stability of dynamical systems, introducing (together with Lev Pontryagin) the notion of structural stability. In that context, he also contributed to the mathematical theory of self-oscillation (a term that he coined) by establishing a link between the generation of oscillations and the theory of Lyapunov stability. He developed the comprehensive theory of self-oscillations by linking it with the qualitative theory of differential equations, topology, and with the general theory of stability of motion.

== Biography ==
Andronov was born in Moscow into a wealthy family. His mother, Lidia, separated from his father when Aleksandr was still a child. His grandfather, the merchant, provided for them. In 1909 Lidia married doctor Korneliy Lipsky, renowned gynecologist, who helped her children get proper education.

In 1918 Aleksandr finished Secondary Level Labour school in Moscow. In 1920, after being deemed unfit for military service due to illness, he enrolled in the Moscow Higher Technical School (MHTS) to the Faculty of Electrical Engineering with specialization in radio engineering. Since 1921, while studying at MHTS began to attend lectures in at the Physics and Mathematics Department of Moscow University (MSU), where he eventually transferred in 1923. In 1925 he graduated from MSU with a degree in theoretical physics.

During his postgraduate years (1926-1929) under the supervision of the outstanding physicist L. I. Mandelstam, he was first engaged in statistical physics and quantum mechanics. Then he concentrated on the issues of oscillation generation, the solution of which determined the direction of his further scientific activity. A. A. Andronov's Ph.D. thesis "Poincaré limit cycles and the theory of oscillations" was published in 1929 in the Proceedings of the Paris Academy of Sciences. It laid the foundation for the theory of nonlinear oscillations, the main method of which was the method of point mappings developed by A. A. Andronov. In connection with the problems of the theory of nonlinear oscillations, Aleksandr Aleksandrovich was engaged in further development of the qualitative theory of differential equations. He introduced new ideas and obtained a number of significant mathematical results.

Since 1929, Alexander Alexandrovich became a researcher at the All-Union Electrotechnical Institute, and in 1930 he enrolled in the Research Institute of Physics at Moscow University. In the post-war years, A. A. Andronov actively participated in the work at the Institute of Automation and Telemechanics (IAT) of the USSR Academy of Sciences (now Institute of Control Sciences RAS). Andronov's visits to Moscow and the work of the scientific seminar he organized had a great influence on IAT scientists such as M. A. Aizerman, M. V. Meerov, V. V. Petrov, and others.

An important part of his life is the period spent in Gorky, where he moved permanently in 1931. He considered the creation of large centers of science in the provinces as the most important state task. That is why he came to work at the Gorky Research Institute of Physics and Technology (GIFTI) and Gorky State University (GSU), where he remained a professor until the end of his life.

On October 31, 1952, Andronov died. At the age of 51 he died of a severe form of hypertension. He is buried in the Bugrovskoye cemetery of Nizhny Novgorod.

== Awards and honors ==
- The Andronov Prize has been granted for outstanding works in the classical mechanics and the control theory by the Soviet (then Russian) Academy of Science in 1971-2024 years.
- The crater Andronov on the Moon is named after him.
