= Bistability =

Quality of a system having two stable equilibrium states

A graph of the potential energy of a bistable system; it has two local minima $x_1$ and $x_2$. A surface shaped like this with two "low points" can act as a bistable system; a ball resting on the surface can only be stable at those two positions, such as balls marked "1" and "2". Between the two is a local maximum $x_3$. A ball located at this point, ball 3, is in equilibrium but unstable; the slightest disturbance will cause it to move to one of the stable points.

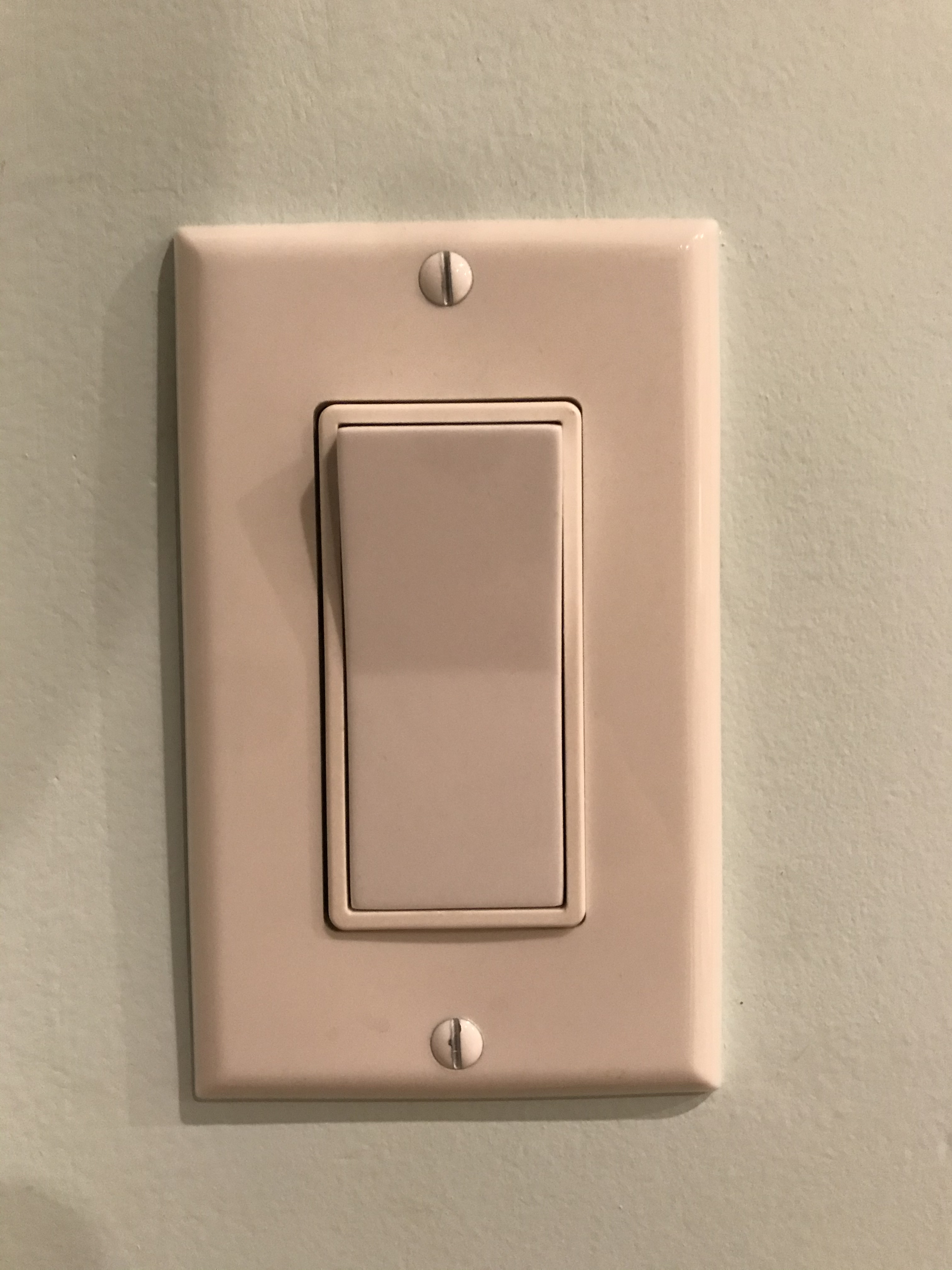
Light switch, a bistable mechanism

In a dynamical system, bistability means the system has two stable equilibrium states. A bistable structure can be resting in either of two states. An example of a mechanical device which is bistable is a light switch. The switch lever is designed to rest in the "on" or "off" position, but not between the two. Bistable behavior can occur in mechanical linkages, electronic circuits, nonlinear optical systems, chemical reactions, and physiological and biological systems.

In a conservative force field, bistability stems from the fact that the potential energy has two local minima, which are the stable equilibrium points. These rest states need not have equal potential energy. By mathematical arguments, a local maximum, an unstable equilibrium point, must lie between the two minima. At rest, a particle will be in one of the minimum equilibrium positions, because that corresponds to the state of lowest energy. The maximum can be visualized as a barrier between them.

A system can transition from one state of minimal energy to the other if it is given enough activation energy to penetrate the barrier (compare activation energy and Arrhenius equation for the chemical case). After the barrier has been reached, assuming the system has damping, it will relax into the other minimum state in a time called the relaxation time.

Bistability is widely used in digital electronics devices to store binary data. It is the essential characteristic of the flip-flop, a circuit which is a fundamental building block of computers and some types of semiconductor memory. A bistable device can store one bit of binary data, with one state representing a "0" and the other state a "1". It is also used in relaxation oscillators, multivibrators, and the Schmitt trigger. Optical bistability is an attribute of certain optical devices where two resonant transmissions states are possible and stable, dependent on the input. Bistability can also arise in biochemical systems, where it creates digital, switch-like outputs from the constituent chemical concentrations and activities. It is often associated with hysteresis in such systems.

== Mathematical modelling ==
In the mathematical language of dynamic systems analysis, one simple bistable system is

$$\frac{dy}{dt} = y (1-y^2).$$

This system describes a ball rolling down a curve with shape $\frac{y^4}{4} - \frac{y^2}{2}$, and has three equilibrium points: $y = 1$, $y = 0$, and $y = -1$. The middle point $y=0$ is an unstable equilibrium point, while the other two points are stable. The direction of change of $y(t)$ over time depends on the initial condition $y(0)$. If the initial condition is positive ($y(0)>0$), then the solution $y(t)$ approaches 1 over time, but if the initial condition is negative ($y(0)< 0$), then $y(t)$ approaches −1 over time. Thus, the dynamics are "bistable". The final state of the system can be either $y = 1$ or $y = -1$, depending on the initial conditions.

The appearance of a bistable region can be understood for the model system $\frac{dy}{dt} = y (r-y^2)$ which undergoes a supercritical pitchfork bifurcation with bifurcation parameter $r$.

== In biological and chemical systems ==
Three-dimensional invariant measure for cellular-differentiation featuring a two-stable mode. The axes denote cell counts for three types of cells: progenitor ($z$), osteoblast ($y$), and chondrocyte ($x$). Pro-osteoblast stimulus promotes P→O transition.

Bistability is key for understanding basic phenomena of cellular functioning, such as decision-making processes in cell cycle progression, cellular differentiation, and apoptosis. It is also involved in loss of cellular homeostasis associated with early events in cancer onset and in prion diseases as well as in the origin of new species (speciation).

Bistability can be generated by a positive feedback loop with an ultrasensitive regulatory step. Positive feedback loops, such as the simple X activates Y and Y activates X motif, essentially link output signals to their input signals and have been noted to be an important regulatory motif in cellular signal transduction because positive feedback loops can create switches with an all-or-nothing decision. Studies have shown that numerous biological systems, such as Xenopus oocyte maturation, mammalian calcium signal transduction, and polarity in budding yeast, incorporate multiple positive feedback loops with different time scales (slow and fast). Having multiple linked positive feedback loops with different time scales ("dual-time switches") allows for (a) increased regulation: two switches that have independent changeable activation and deactivation times; and (b) noise filtering.

Bistability can also arise in a biochemical system only for a particular range of parameter values, where the parameter can often be interpreted as the strength of the feedback. In several typical examples, the system has only one stable fixed point at low values of the parameter. A saddle-node bifurcation gives rise to a pair of new fixed points emerging, one stable and the other unstable, at a critical value of the parameter. The unstable solution can then form another saddle-node bifurcation with the initial stable solution at a higher value of the parameter, leaving only the higher fixed solution. Thus, at values of the parameter between the two critical values, the system has two stable solutions. An example of a dynamical system that demonstrates similar features is

$$\frac{\mathrm{d}x}{\mathrm{d}t} = r + \frac{x^5}{1+x^5} - x$$

where $x$ is the output, and $r$ is the parameter, acting as the input.

Bistability can be modified to be more robust and to tolerate significant changes in concentrations of reactants, while still maintaining its "switch-like" character. Feedback on both the activator of a system and inhibitor make the system able to tolerate a wide range of concentrations. An example of this in cell biology is that activated CDK1 (Cyclin Dependent Kinase 1) activates its activator Cdc25 while at the same time inactivating its inactivator, Wee1, thus allowing for progression of a cell into mitosis. Without this double feedback, the system would still be bistable, but would not be able to tolerate such a wide range of concentrations.

Bistability has also been described in the embryonic development of Drosophila melanogaster (the fruit fly). Examples are anterior-posterior and dorso-ventral axis formation and eye development.

A prime example of bistability in biological systems is that of Sonic hedgehog (Shh), a secreted signaling molecule, which plays a critical role in development. Shh functions in diverse processes in development, including patterning limb bud tissue differentiation. The Shh signaling network behaves as a bistable switch, allowing the cell to abruptly switch states at precise Shh concentrations. gli1 and gli2 transcription is activated by Shh, and their gene products act as transcriptional activators for their own expression and for targets downstream of Shh signaling. Simultaneously, the Shh signaling network is controlled by a negative feedback loop wherein the Gli transcription factors activate the enhanced transcription of a repressor (Ptc). This signaling network illustrates the simultaneous positive and negative feedback loops whose exquisite sensitivity helps create a bistable switch.

Bistability can only arise in biological and chemical systems if three necessary conditions are fulfilled: positive feedback, a mechanism to filter out small stimuli and a mechanism to prevent increase without bound.

Bistable chemical systems have been studied extensively to analyze relaxation kinetics, non-equilibrium thermodynamics, stochastic resonance, as well as climate change. In bistable spatially extended systems the onset of local correlations and propagation of traveling waves have been analyzed.

Bistability is often accompanied by hysteresis. On a population level, if many realisations of a bistable system are considered (e.g. many bistable cells (speciation)), one typically observes bimodal distributions. In an ensemble average over the population, the result may simply look like a smooth transition, thus showing the value of single-cell resolution.

A specific type of instability is known as modehopping, which is bi-stability in the frequency space. Here trajectories can shoot between two stable limit cycles, and thus show similar characteristics as normal bi-stability when measured inside a Poincaré section.

== In mechanical systems ==
A ratchet in action. Each tooth in the ratchet together with the regions to either side of it constitutes a simple bistable mechanism.

Bistability as applied in the design of mechanical systems is more commonly said to be "over centre"—that is, work is done on the system to move it just past the peak, at which point the mechanism goes "over centre" to its secondary stable position. The result is a toggle-type action- work applied to the system below a threshold sufficient to send it 'over center' results in no change to the mechanism's state.

Springs are a common method of achieving an "over centre" action. A spring attached to a simple two position ratchet-type mechanism can create a button or plunger that is clicked or toggled between two mechanical states. Many ballpoint and rollerball retractable pens employ this type of bistable mechanism.

An even more common example of an over-center device is an ordinary electric wall switch. These switches are often designed to snap firmly into the "on" or "off" position once the toggle handle has been moved a certain distance past the center-point.

A ratchet-and-pawl is an elaboration—a multi-stable "over center" system used to create irreversible motion. The pawl goes over center as it is turned in the forward direction. In this case, "over center" refers to the ratchet being stable and "locked" in a given position until clicked forward again; it has nothing to do with the ratchet being unable to turn in the reverse direction.

== Gallery ==
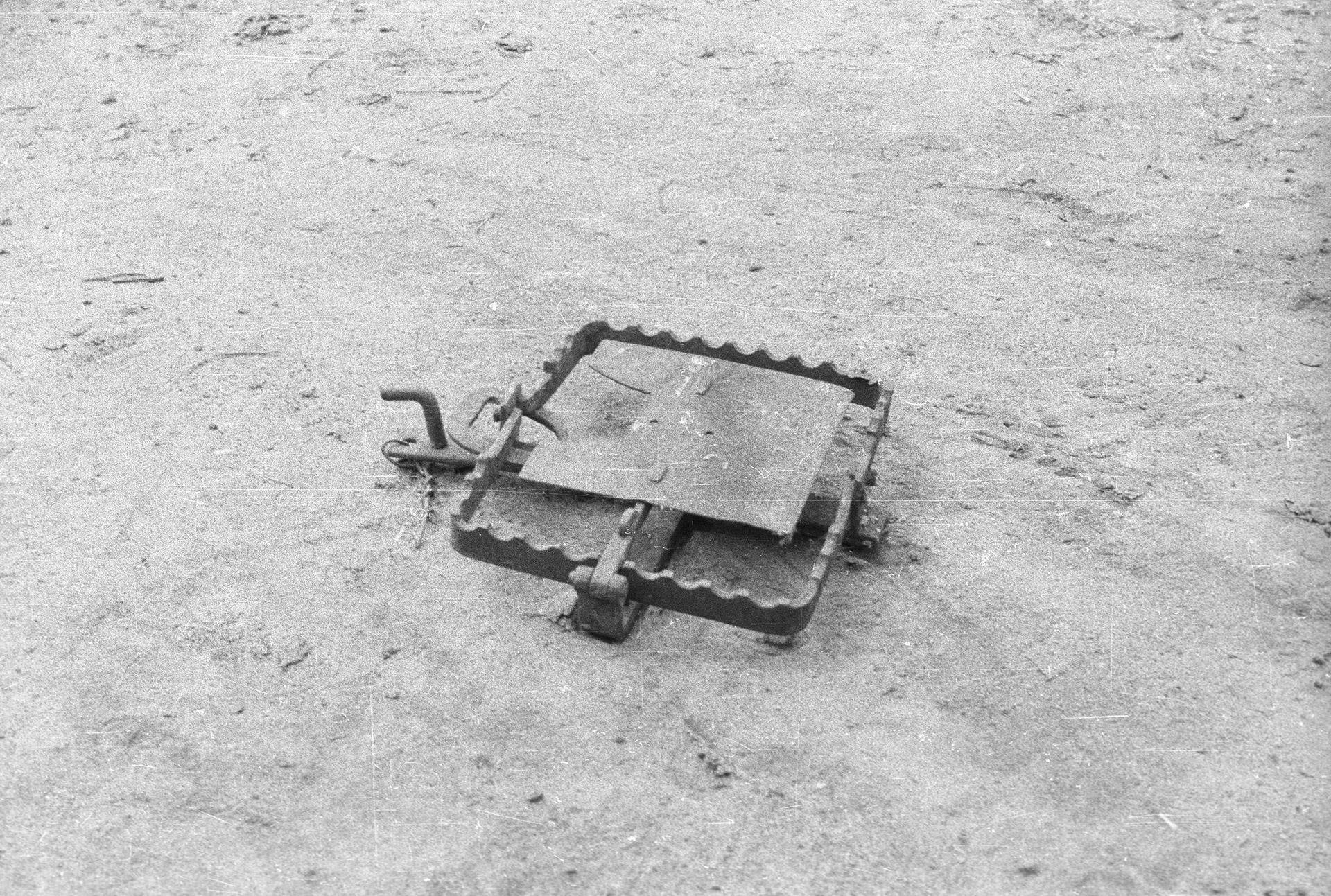
An animal foothold trap

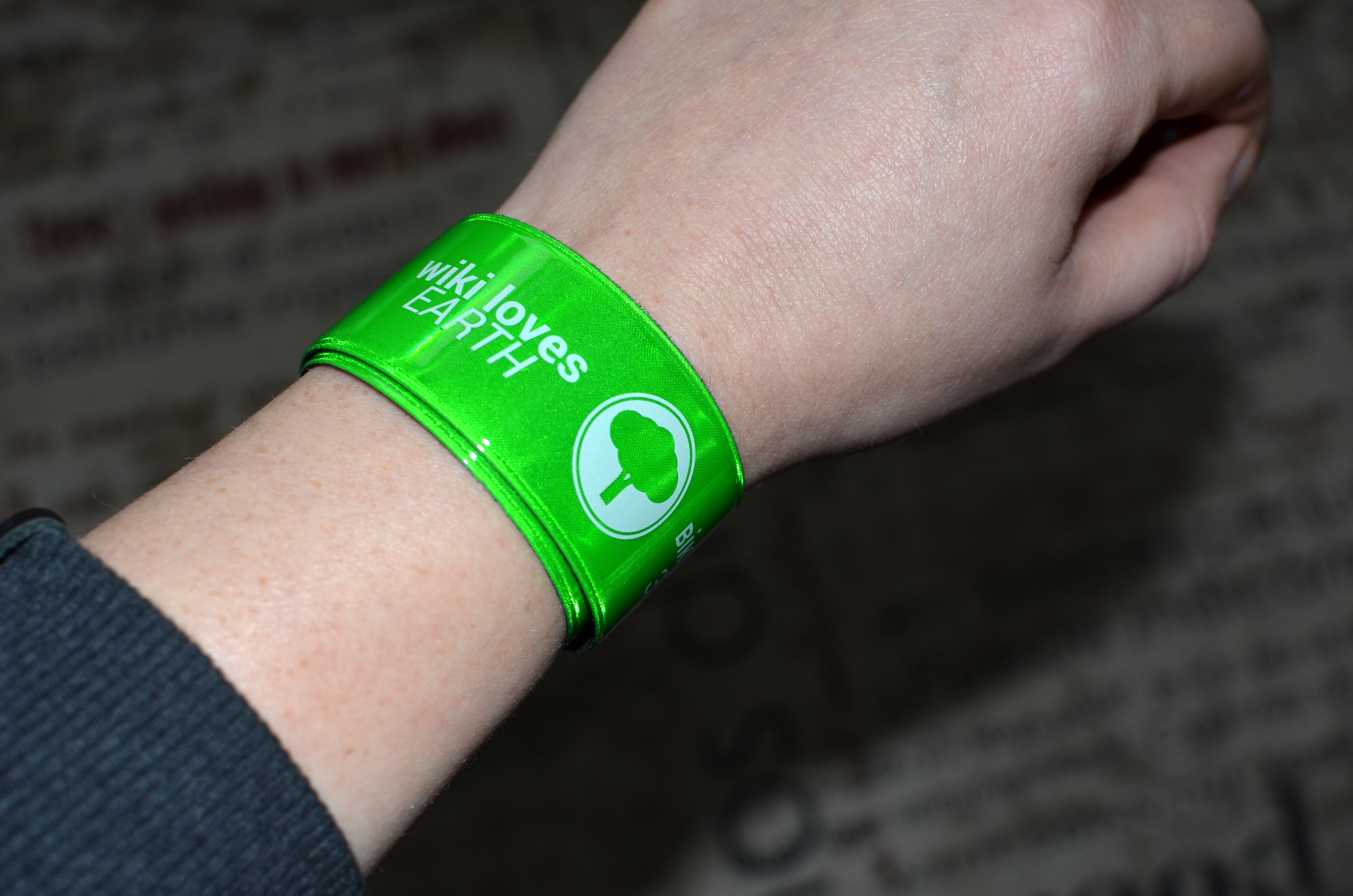
A slap bracelet

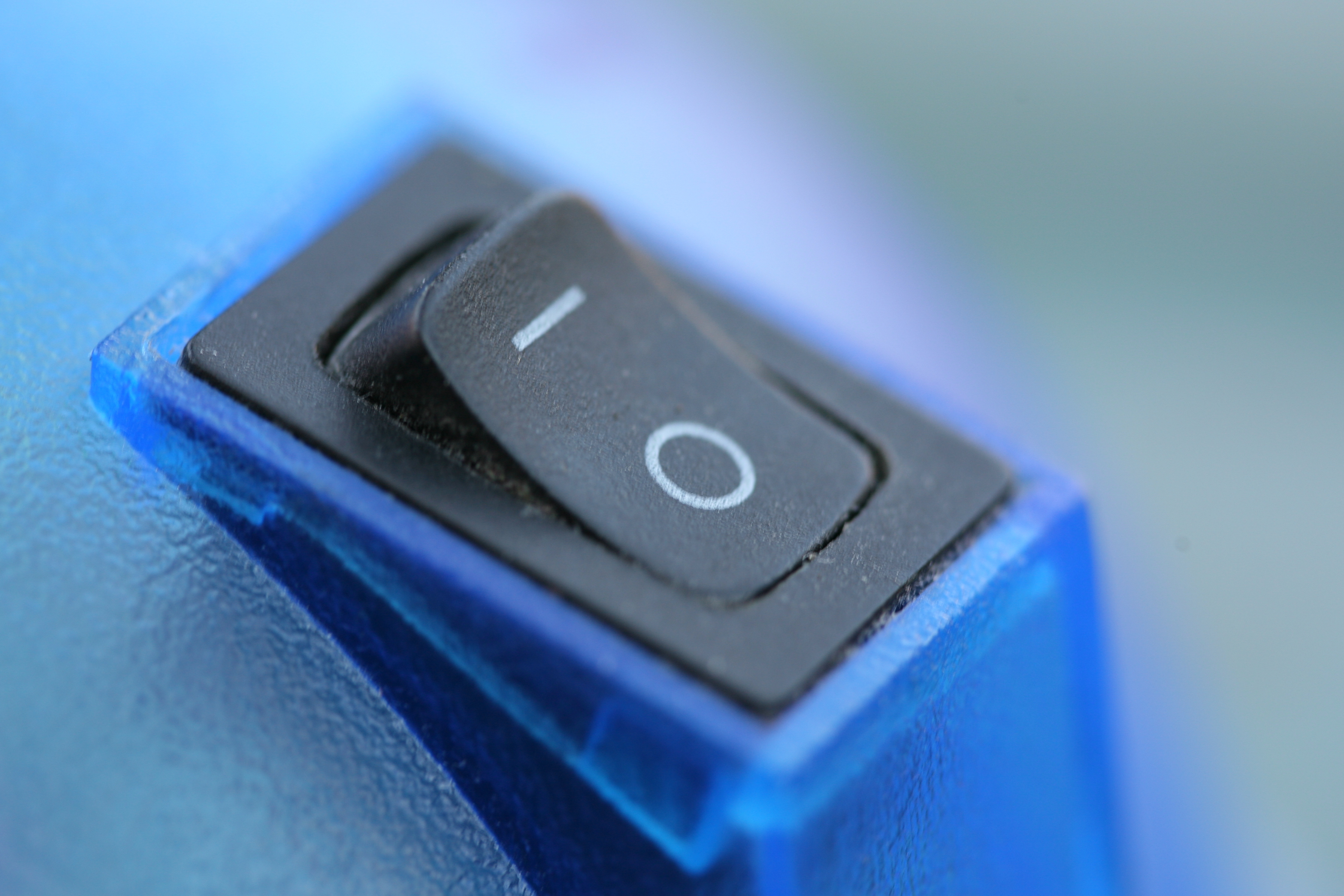
A toggle switch

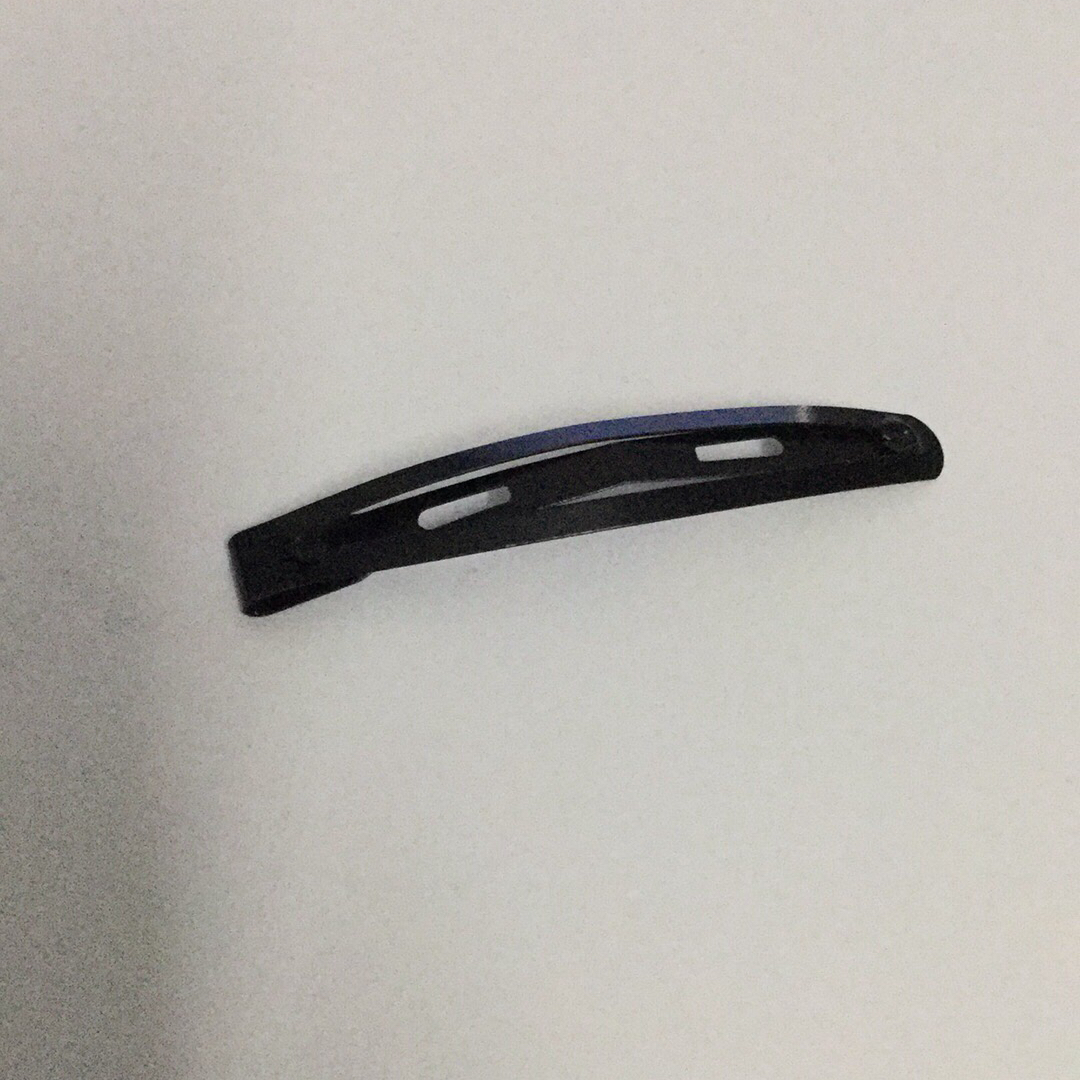
A snapclip

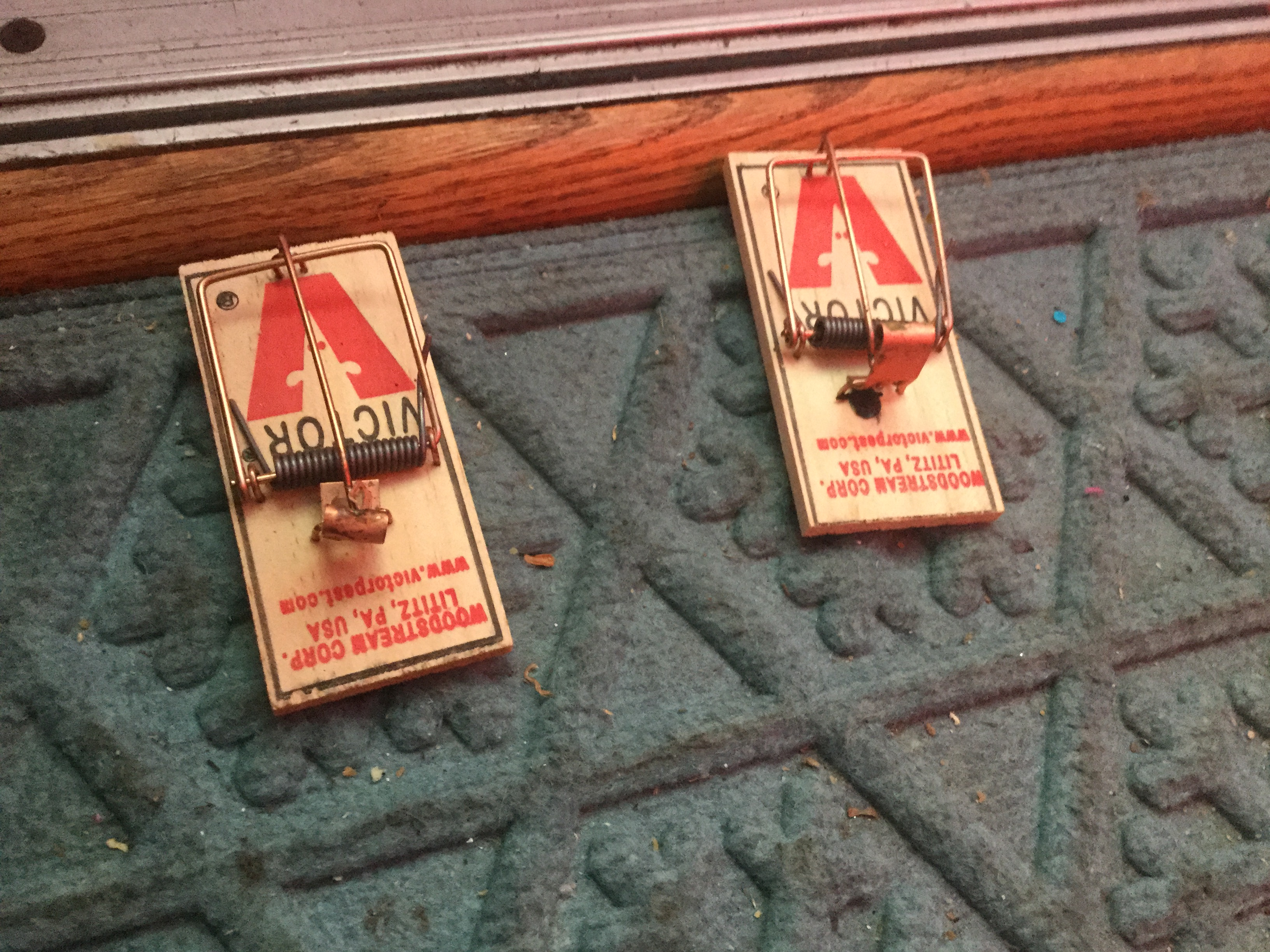
Mouse traps

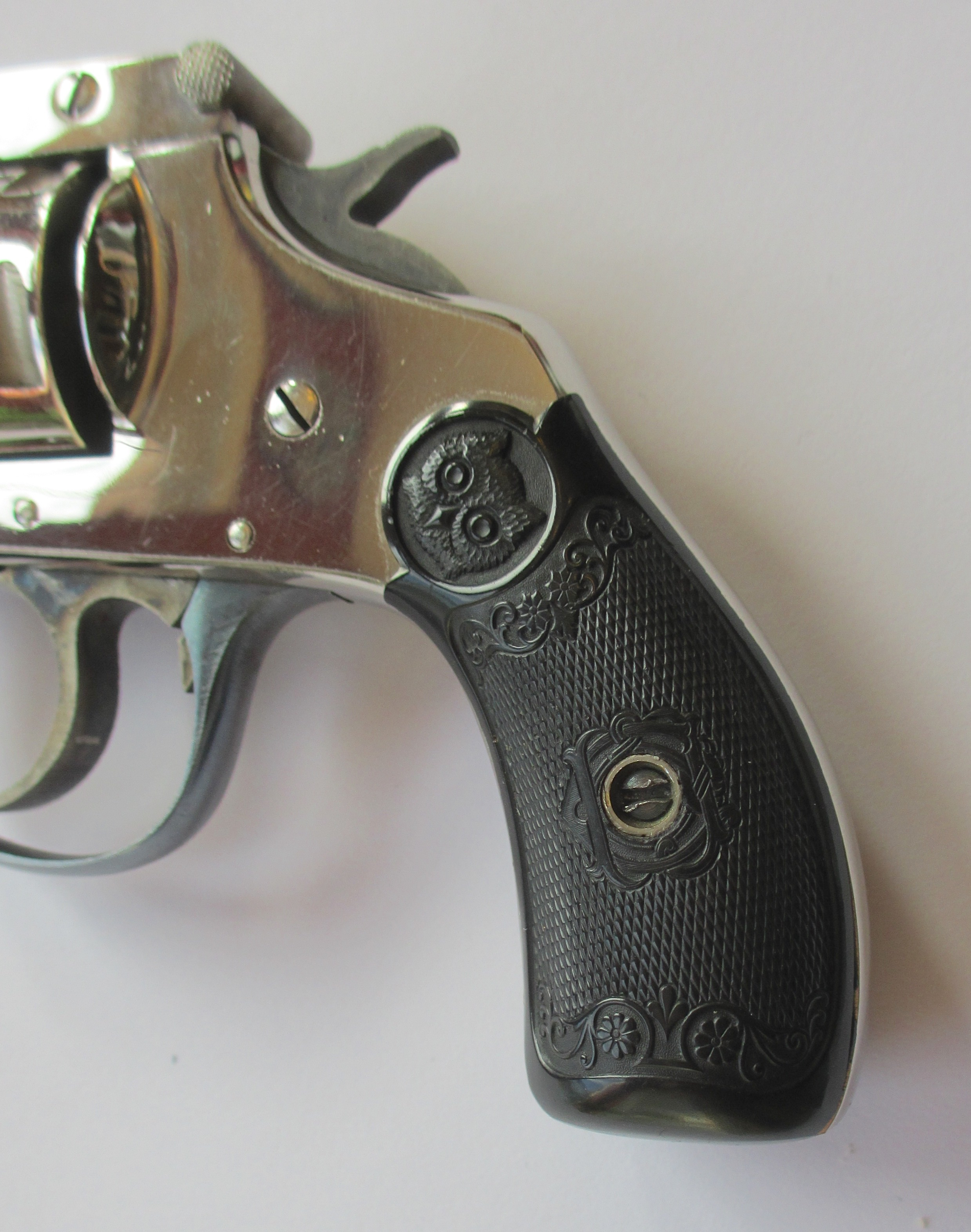
Safety hammer of a revolver

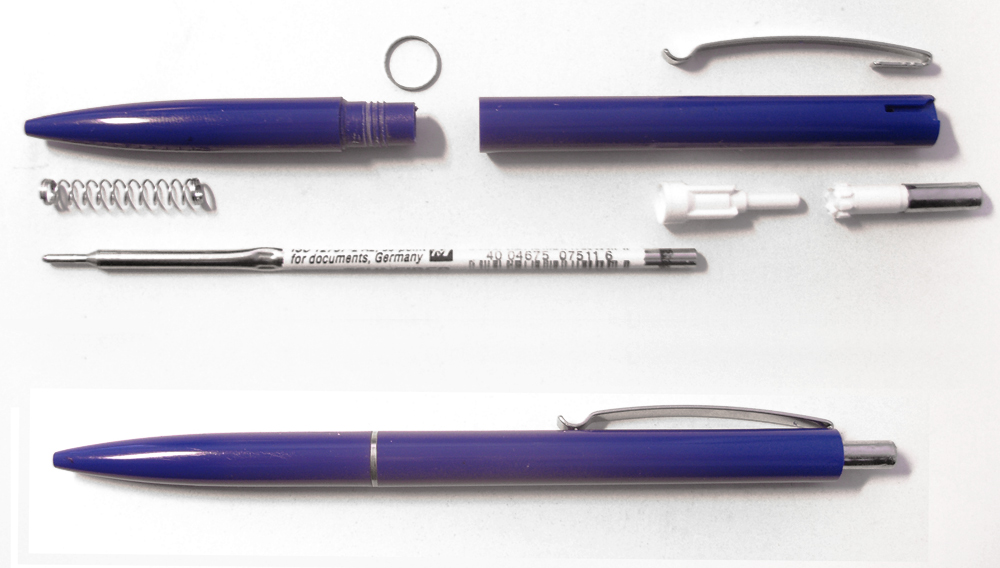
Retractable pen

== See also ==
- Multistability – the generalized case of more than two stable points
- In psychology
- ferroelectric, ferromagnetic, hysteresis, bistable perception
- Schmitt trigger
- strong Allee effect
- Interferometric modulator display, a bistable reflective display technology found in mirasol displays by Qualcomm
