= Bogdanov–Takens bifurcation =

Bifurcation diagrams with parameters β_{1}, β_{2} = (from top-left to bottom-right): (−1,1), (1/4,−1), (1,0), (0,0), (−6/25,−1), (0,1).

In bifurcation theory, a field within mathematics, a Bogdanov–Takens bifurcation is a well-studied example of a bifurcation with co-dimension two, meaning that two parameters must be varied for the bifurcation to occur. It is named after Rifkat Bogdanov and Floris Takens, who independently and simultaneously described this bifurcation.

A system y' = f(y) undergoes a Bogdanov–Takens bifurcation if it has a fixed point and the linearization of f around that point has a double eigenvalue at zero (assuming that some technical nondegeneracy conditions are satisfied).

Three codimension-one bifurcations occur nearby: a saddle-node bifurcation, an Andronov–Hopf bifurcation and a homoclinic bifurcation. All associated bifurcation curves meet at the Bogdanov–Takens bifurcation.

The normal form of the Bogdanov–Takens bifurcation is

$$\begin{align}
y_1' &= y_2, \\
y_2' &= \beta_1 + \beta_2 y_1 + y_1^2 \pm y_1 y_2.
\end{align}$$

There exist two codimension-three degenerate Takens–Bogdanov bifurcations, also known as Dumortier–Roussarie–Sotomayor bifurcations.
