= Bogdanov map =

Chaotic 2D map related to the Bogdanov–Takens bifurcation

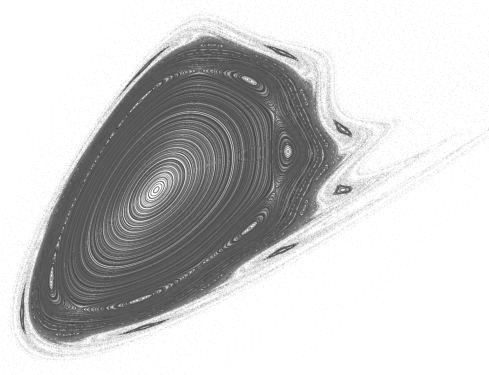
Example with ε=0, k=1.2, μ=0.

In dynamical systems theory, the Bogdanov map is a chaotic 2D map related to the Bogdanov–Takens bifurcation. It is given by the transformation:

$$\begin{cases}
x_{n+1} = x_n + y_{n+1}\\
y_{n+1} = y_n + \epsilon y_n + k x_n (x_n - 1) + \mu x_n y_n
\end{cases}$$

The Bogdanov map is named after Rifkat Bogdanov.

== See also ==
- List of chaotic maps
