= Thomas' cyclically symmetric attractor =

Attractor in dynamical systems theory

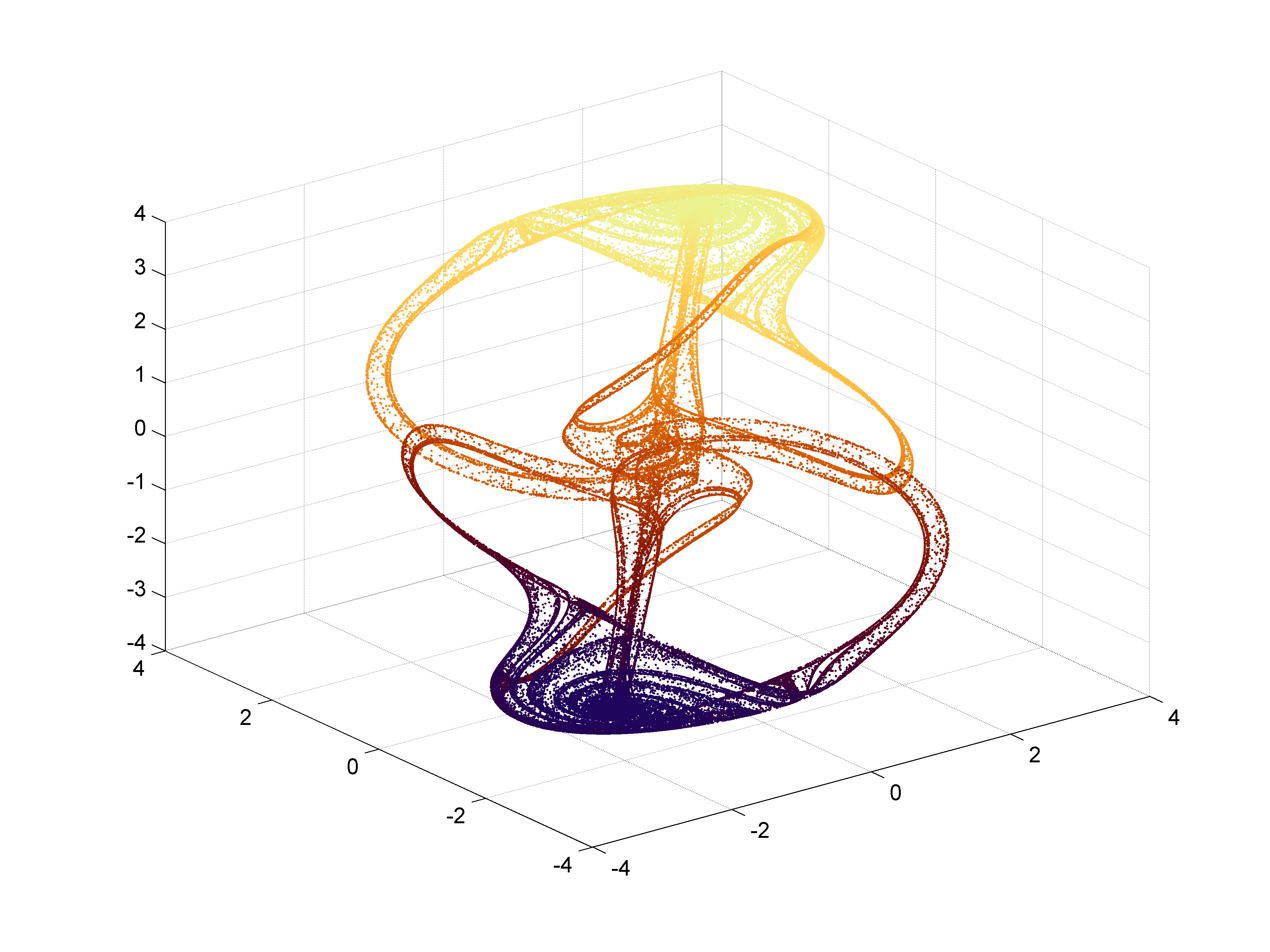
Thomas' cyclically symmetric attractor.

In the dynamical systems theory, Thomas' cyclically symmetric attractor is a 3D strange attractor originally proposed by René Thomas. It has a simple form which is cyclically symmetric in the x, y, and z variables and can be viewed as the trajectory of a frictionally dampened particle moving in a 3D lattice of forces. The simple form has made it a popular example.

It is described by the differential equations

$$\frac{dx}{dt} = \sin(y)-bx$$
$$\frac{dy}{dt} = \sin(z)-by$$
$$\frac{dz}{dt} = \sin(x)-bz$$

where $b$ is a constant.

$b$ corresponds to how dissipative the system is, and acts as a bifurcation parameter. For $b>1$ the origin is the single stable equilibrium. At $b=1$ it undergoes a pitchfork bifurcation, splitting into two attractive fixed points. As the parameter is decreased further they undergo a Hopf bifurcation at $b\approx 0.32899$, creating a stable limit cycle. The limit cycle then undergoes a period doubling cascade and becomes chaotic at $b\approx 0.208186$. Beyond this the attractor expands, undergoing a series of crises (up to six separate attractors can coexist for certain values). The fractal dimension of the attractor increases towards 3.

In the limit $b=0$ the system lacks dissipation and the trajectory ergodically wanders the entire space (with an exception for 1.67%, where it drifts parallel to one of the coordinate axes: this corresponds to quasiperiodic torii). The dynamics has been described as deterministic fractional Brownian motion, and exhibits anomalous diffusion.
