= List of chaotic maps =

In mathematics, a chaotic map is a map (an evolution function) that exhibits some sort of chaotic behavior. Maps may be parameterized by a discrete-time or a continuous-time parameter. Discrete maps usually take the form of iterated functions. Chaotic maps often occur in the study of dynamical systems.

Chaotic maps and iterated functions often generate fractals. Some fractals are studied as objects themselves, as sets rather than in terms of the maps that generate them. This is often because there are several different iterative procedures that generate the same fractal. See also Universality (dynamical systems).

== List of chaotic maps ==
Map	Time domain	Space domain	Number of space dimensions	Number of parameters	Also known as
2D Lorenz system	discrete	real	2	1	Euler method approximation to (non-chaotic) ODE.
2D Rational chaotic map	discrete	rational	2	2	
3-cells CNN system	continuous	real	3		
ACT chaotic attractor	continuous	real	3		
Aizawa chaotic attractor	continuous	real	3	5	
Arneodo chaotic system	continuous	real	3		
Arnold's cat map	discrete	real	2	0	
Baker's map	discrete	real	2	0	
Basin chaotic map	discrete	real	2	1	
Beta Chaotic Map				12	
Bogdanov map	discrete	real	2	3	
Brusselator	continuous	real	3		
Burke-Shaw chaotic attractor	continuous	real	3	2	
Chen chaotic attractor	continuous	real	3	3	Not topologically conjugate to the Lorenz attractor.
Chen-Celikovsky system	continuous	real	3		"Generalized Lorenz canonical form of chaotic systems"
Chen-LU system	continuous	real	3	3	Interpolates between Lorenz-like and Chen-like behavior.
Chen-Lee system	continuous	real	3		
Chialvo map	discrete	discrete		3	
Chossat-Golubitsky symmetry map					
Chua circuit	continuous	real	3	3	
Circle map	discrete	real	1	2	
Complex quadratic map	discrete	complex	1	1	gives rise to the Mandelbrot set
Complex squaring map	discrete	complex	1	0	acts on the Julia set for the squaring map.
Complex cubic map	discrete	complex	1	2	
Clifford fractal map	discrete	real	2	4	
Degenerate Double Rotor map					
De Jong fractal map	discrete	real	2	4	
Delayed-Logistic system	discrete	real	2	1	
Discretized circular Van der Pol system	discrete	real	2	1	Euler method approximation to 'circular' Van der Pol-like ODE.
Discretized Van der Pol system	discrete	real	2	2	Euler method approximation to Van der Pol ODE.
Double rotor map					
Duffing map	discrete	real	2	2	Holmes chaotic map
Duffing equation	continuous	real	2	5 (3 independent)	
Dyadic transformation	discrete	real	1	0	2x mod 1 map, Bernoulli map, doubling map, sawtooth map
Exponential map	discrete	complex	2	1	
Feigenbaum strange nonchaotic map	discrete	real	3		
Finance system	continuous	real	3		
Folded-Towel hyperchaotic map	continuous	real	3		
Fractal-Dream system	discrete	real	2		
Gauss map	discrete	real	1		mouse map, Gaussian map
Generalized Baker map					
Genesio-Tesi chaotic attractor	continuous	real	3		
Gingerbreadman map	discrete	real	2	0	
Grinch dragon fractal	discrete	real	2		
Gumowski/Mira map	discrete	real	2	1	
Hadley chaotic circulation	continuous	real	3	0	
Half-inverted Rössler attractor					
Halvorsen chaotic attractor	continuous	real	3		
Hénon map	discrete	real	2	2	
Hénon with 5th order polynomial					
Hindmarsh-Rose neuronal model	continuous	real	3	8	
Hitzl-Zele map					
Horseshoe map	discrete	real	2	1	
Hopa-Jong fractal	discrete	real	2		
Hopalong orbit fractal	discrete	real	2		
Hyper Logistic map	discrete	real	2		
Hyperchaotic Chen system	continuous	real	3		
Hyper Newton-Leipnik system	continuous	real	4		
Hyper-Lorenz chaotic attractor	continuous	real	4		
Hyper-Lu chaotic system	continuous	real	4		
Hyper-Rössler chaotic attractor	continuous	real	4		
Hyperchaotic attractor	continuous	real	4		
Ikeda chaotic attractor	continuous	real	3		
Ikeda map	discrete	real	2	3	Ikeda fractal map
Interval exchange map	discrete	real	1	variable	
Kaplan-Yorke map	discrete	real	2	1	
Knot fractal map	discrete	real	2		
Knot-Holder chaotic oscillator	continuous	real	3		
Kuramoto–Sivashinsky equation	continuous	real			
Lambić map	discrete	discrete	1		
Li symmetrical toroidal chaos	continuous	real	3		
Linear map on unit square					
Logistic map	discrete	real	1	1	
Lorenz system	continuous	real	3	3	
Lorenz system's Poincaré return map	discrete	real	2	3	
Lorenz 96 model	continuous	real	arbitrary	1	
Lotka-Volterra system	continuous	real	3	9	
Lozi map	discrete	real	2		
Moore-Spiegel chaotic oscillator	continuous	real	3		
Scroll-Attractor	continuous	real	3		
Jerk Circuit	continuous	real	3		
Newton-Leipnik system	continuous	real	3		
Nordmark truncated map					
Nosé-Hoover system	continuous	real	3		
Novel chaotic system	continuous	real	3		
Pickover fractal map	continuous	real	3		
Pomeau-Manneville maps for intermittent chaos	discrete	real	1 or 2		Normal-form maps for intermittency (Types I, II and III)
Polynom Type-A fractal map	continuous	real	3	3	
Polynom Type-B fractal map	continuous	real	3	6	
Polynom Type-C fractal map	continuous	real	3	18	
Pulsed rotor					
Quadrup-Two orbit fractal	discrete	real	2	3	
Quasiperiodicity map					
Mikhail Anatoly chaotic attractor	continuous	real	3	2	
Random Rotate map					
Rayleigh-Benard chaotic oscillator	continuous	real	3	3	
Rikitake chaotic attractor	continuous	real	3	3	
Rössler attractor	continuous	real	3	3	
Rucklidge system	continuous	real	3	2	
Sakarya chaotic attractor	continuous	real	3	2	
Shaw-Pol chaotic oscillator	continuous	real	3	3	
Shimizu-Morioka system	continuous	real	3	2	
Shobu-Ose-Mori piecewise-linear map	discrete	real	1		piecewise-linear approximation for Pomeau-Manneville Type I map
Shukur hyperchaotic map	discrete	real	3	3	
Sinai map -					
Sprott B chaotic system	continuous	real	3	2	
Sprott C chaotic system	continuous	real	3	3	
Sprott-Linz A chaotic attractor	continuous	real	3	0	
Sprott-Linz B chaotic attractor	continuous	real	3	0	
Sprott-Linz C chaotic attractor	continuous	real	3	0	
Sprott-Linz D chaotic attractor	continuous	real	3	1	
Sprott-Linz E chaotic attractor	continuous	real	3	1	
Sprott-Linz F chaotic attractor	continuous	real	3	1	
Sprott-Linz G chaotic attractor	continuous	real	3	1	
Sprott-Linz H chaotic attractor	continuous	real	3	1	
Sprott-Linz I chaotic attractor	continuous	real	3	1	
Sprott-Linz J chaotic attractor	continuous	real	3	1	
Sprott-Linz K chaotic attractor	continuous	real	3	1	
Sprott-Linz L chaotic attractor	continuous	real	3	2	
Sprott-Linz M chaotic attractor	continuous	real	3	1	
Sprott-Linz N chaotic attractor	continuous	real	3	1	
Sprott-Linz O chaotic attractor	continuous	real	3	1	
Sprott-Linz P chaotic attractor	continuous	real	3	1	
Sprott-Linz Q chaotic attractor	continuous	real	3	2	
Sprott-Linz R chaotic attractor	continuous	real	3	2	
Sprott-Linz S chaotic attractor	continuous	real	3	1	
Standard map, Kicked rotor	discrete	real	2	1	Chirikov standard map, Chirikov-Taylor map
Strizhak-Kawczynski chaotic oscillator	continuous	real	3	9	
Symmetric Flow attractor	continuous	real	3	1	
Symplectic map					
Tangent map					
Tahn map	discrete	real	1	1	Ring laser map Beta distribution
Thomas' cyclically symmetric attractor	continuous	real	3	1	
Tent map	discrete	real	1		
Tinkerbell map	discrete	real	2	4	
Triangle map					
Ueda chaotic oscillator	continuous	real	3	3	
Van der Pol oscillator	continuous	real	2	3	
Weierstrass map	discrete	real	1	4	Gives rise to arbitrarily large global Lyapunov exponent
Willamowski-Rössler model	continuous	real	3	10	
WINDMI chaotic attractor	continuous	real	1	2	
Zaslavskii map	discrete	real	2	4	
Zaslavskii rotation map					
Zeraoulia-Sprott map	discrete	real	2	2	

== List of fractals ==
- Cantor set
- de Rham curve
- Gravity set, or Mitchell-Green gravity set
- Julia set - derived from complex quadratic map
- Koch snowflake - special case of de Rham curve
- Lyapunov fractal
- Mandelbrot set - derived from complex quadratic map
- Menger sponge
- Newton fractal
- Nova fractal - derived from Newton fractal
- Quaternionic fractal - three dimensional complex quadratic map
- Sierpinski carpet
- Sierpinski triangle
