= Bistable =

Bistable may refer to:

- Bistability in physics; something that can rest in two states
- Bistable circuit, also known as a flip-flop or latch
