= Catastrophe =

Catastrophe or catastrophic comes from the Greek κατά (kata) = down; στροφή (strophē) = turning (Greek: καταστροφή). It may refer to the following:

== A general or specific event ==
- Disaster, a devastating event
- The Asia Minor Catastrophe, a Greek name for the 1923 Greek defeat at the Greco-Turkish War
- The Holocaust, also known by the Hebrew name HaShoah which translates to "The Catastrophe"
- The Chernobyl catastrophe, also known as the Chernobyl disaster
- Blue sky catastrophe, a type of bifurcation of a periodic orbit, where the orbit vanishes into the blue sky
- Catastrophic failure, complete failure of a system from which recovery is impossible (e.g. a bridge collapses)
- Climate catastrophe, also known as climate apocalypse
- Ecological catastrophe, a disaster to the natural environment due to human activity
- Error catastrophe, extinction of an organism as a result of excessive mutations
- The Ikiza, which translates to the catastrophe from Kirundi, in Central Africa
- Infrared catastrophe or infrared divergence is a situation in particle physics in which a particular integral diverges
- Iron catastrophe, runaway melting of early Earth's interior as a result of potential energy release from sinking iron and nickel melted by heat of radioactive decay
- Malthusian catastrophe, prediction of a forced return to subsistence-level conditions once population growth has outpaced agricultural production
- Mitotic catastrophe, an event in which a cell is destroyed during mitosis
- Nakba, Arabic word meaning catastrophe, referring to the 1948 Palestinian expulsion and flight, and ongoing ethnic cleansing by Israel of Palestinian Arabs
- Nedelin catastrophe, launch pad accident at Baikonur test range of Baikonur Cosmodrome
- Oxygen catastrophe, the biologically induced appearance of dioxygen (O2) in Earth's atmosphere
- Toba catastrophe theory, hypothesis that the Toba supervolcanic eruption caused a global volcanic winter and 1,000-year-long cooling episode
- Ultraviolet catastrophe, the prediction by classical physics that a black body will emit radiation at infinite power
- Vacuum catastrophe, the discrepancy between theoretical and measured vacuum energy density in cosmology

== Art, entertainment, and media ==
=== Fictional entities ===
- Catastrophe, the main antagonist in The Secret Files of the Spy Dogs

=== Film ===
- Catastrophe (film), a 1977 American documentary film
- The Catastrophe (film), a 2011 American short film

=== Literature ===
- Catastrophe (Morris and McGann book), a 2009 non-fiction book by Dick Morris and Eileen McGann
- Catastrophe (drama), the climax and resolution of a plot in ancient Greek drama and poetry
- Catastrophe (play), a 1982 short play by Samuel Beckett
- Catastrophe: Risk and Response, a 2004 non-fiction book by Richard Posner

=== Music ===
- Catastrophic (band), a band featuring Trevor Peres
- “catastrophe” [Stylized in Lowercase] 2025 single By American Rapper, Ken Carson

=== Television ===
- Catastrophe (2008 TV series), a five-part science series on Channel 4, presented by Tony Robinson
- Catastrophe (2015 TV series), a 2015 sitcom starring Sharon Horgan and Rob Delaney

== Other uses ==
- Catastrophe theory, a theory by the French mathematician René Thom and the object of its study
- Catastrophic fire danger, a level in the Australian Fire Danger Rating System

== See also ==
- Accidentalism and catastrophism
- Cape Catastrophe
- Catastrophisation
- Catastrophism
- Katastrophe (disambiguation)
