= Saddle-node bifurcation =

Local bifurcation in which two fixed points of a dynamical system collide and anni

In the mathematical area of bifurcation theory a saddle-node bifurcation, tangential bifurcation or fold bifurcation is a local bifurcation in which two fixed points (or equilibria) of a dynamical system collide and annihilate each other. The term 'saddle-node bifurcation' is most often used in reference to continuous dynamical systems. In discrete dynamical systems, the same bifurcation is often instead called a fold bifurcation. Another name is blue sky bifurcation in reference to the sudden creation of two fixed points.

If the phase space is one-dimensional, one of the equilibrium points is unstable (the saddle), while the other is stable (the node).

Saddle-node bifurcations may be associated with hysteresis loops and catastrophes.

== Normal form ==
A typical example of a differential equation with a saddle-node bifurcation is:

$$\frac{dx}{dt}=r+x^2.$$

Here $x$ is the state variable and $r$ is the bifurcation parameter.

- If $r<0$ there are two equilibrium points, a stable equilibrium point at $-\sqrt{-r}$ and an unstable one at $+\sqrt{-r}$.
- At $r=0$ (the bifurcation point) there is exactly one equilibrium point. At this point the fixed point is no longer hyperbolic. In this case the fixed point is called a saddle-node fixed point.
- If $r>0$ there are no equilibrium points.

Saddle node bifurcation

In fact, this is a normal form of a saddle-node bifurcation. A scalar differential equation $\tfrac{dx}{dt} = f(r,x)$ which has a fixed point at $x = 0$ for $r = 0$ with $\tfrac{\partial f}{\partial x}(0,0) = 0$ is locally topologically equivalent to $\frac{dx}{dt} = r \pm x^2$, provided it satisfies $\tfrac{\partial^2\! f}{\partial x^2}(0,0) \ne 0$ and $\tfrac{\partial f}{\partial r}(0,0) \ne 0$. The first condition is the nondegeneracy condition and the second condition is the transversality condition.

== Example in two dimensions ==
Phase portrait showing saddle-node bifurcation

An example of a saddle-node bifurcation in two dimensions occurs in the two-dimensional dynamical system:

$$\frac {dx} {dt} = \alpha - x^2$$
$$\frac {dy} {dt} = - y.$$

As can be seen by the animation obtained by plotting phase portraits by varying the parameter $\alpha$,

- When $\alpha$ is negative, there are no equilibrium points.
- When $\alpha = 0$, there is a saddle-node point.
- When $\alpha$ is positive, there are two equilibrium points: that is, one saddle point and one node (either an attractor or a repellor).

Other examples are in modelling biological switches. Recently, it was shown that under certain conditions, the Einstein field equations of General Relativity have the same form as a fold bifurcation. A non-autonomous version of the saddle-node bifurcation (i.e. the parameter is time-dependent) has also been studied.

== See also ==
- Pitchfork bifurcation
- Transcritical bifurcation
- Hopf bifurcation
- Saddle point
