= Tinker Bell (disambiguation) =

Tinker Bell is fictional character in the form of a fairy.

Tinker Bell may also refer to:

- Tinker Bell (Disney character), the Disney adaptation of the fairy character
- Tinker Bell (film series), an animated film series produced by DisneyToon Studios
- Tinker Bell (film), the original, 2008 film in this series
- Disney Fairies: Tinker Bell, a video game loosely based on the first animated film

== See also ==
- Tinkerbell effect
- Tinkerbell map, a discrete-time dynamical system
- Tinkerbelle, a sailboat
- Tinkerbelle the Dog, canine model
- Tinkebell (born 1979), Dutch artist
- Tink (disambiguation)
