= George Zaslavsky =

Soviet physicist (1935–2008)

- Born: George M. Zaslavsky; 31 May 1935; Odessa, USSR
- Died: 25 November 2008 (aged 73); New York City
- Education: University of Odessa
- Known for: Hamiltonian chaos
- Scientific career
- Fields: Mathematics, physics
- Workplaces: Institute of Nuclear Physics, Institute of Space Research, New York University, Courant Institute of Mathematical Sciences

George M. Zaslavsky (Cyrillic: Георгий Моисеевич Заславский) (31 May 1935 – 25 November 2008) was a Soviet mathematical physicist and one of the founders of the physics of dynamical chaos.

== Early life ==
Zaslavsky was born in Odessa, Ukraine on 31 May 1935. His father was an artillery officer who dragged his cannon in World War II and survived there. Zaslavsky received his education at the University of Odessa and moved to Novosibirsk in 1957 where a golden age of Siberian physics was beginning.

== Career ==
In 1965, Zaslavsky joined the Institute of Nuclear Physics where he became interested in nonlinear problems of accelerator and plasma physics. Roald Sagdeev and Boris Chirikov helped him form an interest in the theory of dynamical chaos. In 1968, Zaslavsky and his colleagues introduced a separatrix map that became one of the major tools in the theoretical study of Hamiltonian chaos. The work "Stochastical instability of nonlinear oscillations" by G. Zaslavsky and B. Chirikov, published in Physics Uspekhi in 1971, was the first review paper to "open the eyes" of many physicists to the power of the dynamical systems theory and modern ergodic theory. It was realized that very complicated behavior is possible in dynamical systems with only a few degrees of freedom. This complexity cannot be adequately described in terms of individual trajectories and requires statistical methods. Typical Hamiltonian systems are not integrable but chaotic, and this chaos is not homogeneous. At the same values of the control parameters, there coexist regions in the phase space with regular and chaotic motion. The results obtained in the 60th were summarized in the book "Statistical Irreversibility in Nonlinear Systems" (Nauka, Moscow, 1970).

The end of the 1960s was a difficult time for Zaslavsky. He was forced to leave the Institute of Nuclear Physics in Novosibirsk for signing letters in defense of some Soviet dissidents. Zaslavsky got a position at the Institute of Physics in Krasnoyarsk, not far away from Novosibirsk. There he founded a laboratory of the theory of nonlinear processes which still exists today. In Krasnoyarsk he became interested in the theory of quantum chaos. The first rigorous theory of quantum resonance was developed in 1977. He introduced the important notion of quantum break time (the Ehrenfest time) after which quantum evolution begins to deviate from a semiclassical one. The results obtained in Krasnoyarsk were summarized in the book Chaos in Dynamical Systems (Nauka, Moscow and Harwood, Amsterdam, 1985). In 1981, Zaslavsky and Sadrilla Abdullaev published the first paper on chaotic instability of sound rays in idealized underwater waveguides. The first results of their studies on this topic were summarized in a review paper published in Physics Uspekhi in 1991. Now it is a well-developed branch in ocean acoustics known as ray and wave chaos in underwater sound channels.

In 1984, Roald Sagdeev invited Zaslavsky to the Institute of Space Research in Moscow. There he has worked on the theory of degenerate and almost degenerate Hamiltonian systems, anomalous chaotic transport, plasma physics, and theory of chaos in waveguides. The book Nonlinear Physics: from the Pendulum to Turbulence and Chaos (Nauka, Moscow and Harwood, New York, 1988), written with Sagdeev, is now a classical textbook for chaos theory. When studying interaction of a charged particle with a wave packet, Zaslavsky with colleagues from that institute discovered that stochastic layers of different separatrices in degenerated Hamiltonian systems may merge producing a stochastic web. Unlike the famous Arnold diffusion in non-degenerated Hamiltonian systems, that appears only if the number of degrees of freedom exceeds 2, diffusion in the Zaslavsky webs is possible at one and half degrees of freedom. This diffusion is rather universal phenomenon and its speed is much greater than that of Arnold diffusion. Beautiful symmetries of the Zaslavsky webs and their properties in different branches of physics have been described in the book Weak Chaos and Quasi-Regular Structures (Nauka, Moscow, 1991 and Cambridge University Press, Cambridge, 1991) coauthored with R. Sagdeev, D. Usikov, and A. Chernikov.

=== In the United States ===
In 1991 Zaslavsky emigrated to the United States and became a professor of physics and mathematics at the physics department of New York University and the Courant Institute of Mathematical Sciences. There he studied the principal problems of Hamiltonian chaos connected with anomalous kinetics and fractional dynamics, foundations of statistical mechanics, chaotic advection, quantum chaos, and long-range propagation of acoustic waves in the ocean. In his New York period, he published two seminal books on the Hamiltonian chaos: Physics of Chaos in Hamiltonian Systems (Imperial College Press, London, 1998) and Hamiltonian Chaos and Fractional Dynamics (Oxford University Press, New York, 2005). Zaslavsky was one of the key persons in the theory of dynamical chaos who made important contributions to a variety of other subjects. He authored and coauthored nine books and more than 300 papers in scientific journals. His books and papers influenced and are influencing very much in advancing modern nonlinear science.

Zaslavsky died on November 25, 2008 and is buried at the Mount Hebron Cemetery in Flushing, Queens.

== Books (in English) ==
- G. M. Zaslavsky, Chaos in Dynamic Systems. New-York: Harwood Academic Publishers, 1985. 370 pages. ISBN 3-7186-0225-3 (3-7186-0225-3)
- R. Z. Sagdeev, D. A. Usikov, G. M. Zaslavsky, Nonlinear Physics: From the Pendulum to Turbulence and Chaos. New-York: Harwood Academic Publishers, 1988. ISBN 3-7186-4832-6 (3-7186-4832-6)
- G. M. Zaslavsky, R. Z. Sagdeev, D. A. Usikov, A. A. Chemikov, Weak Chaos and Quasi-Regular Patterns. Cambridge: Cambridge University Press, 1991. 265 pages ISBN 0-521-37317-4
- G. M. Zaslavsky, Physics of Chaos in Hamiltonian Dynamics. London: Imperial College Press, 1998. 350 pages ISBN 1-86094-795-6 (1-86094-795-6)
- G. M. Zaslavsky, Hamiltonian Chaos and Fractional Dynamics. Oxford: Oxford University Press, 2005. ISBN 0-19-852604-0 (0-19-852604-0).
- D. Makarov, S. Prants, A. Virovlyansky, and G. Zaslavsky. Ray and wave chaos in ocean acoustics (Chaos in waveguides). World Scientific Press: Singapore, 2009.

== See also ==
- Zaslavskii map, a dynamical system that exhibits chaotic behavior
