= Zaslavskii map =

Dynamical system that exhibits chaotic behavior

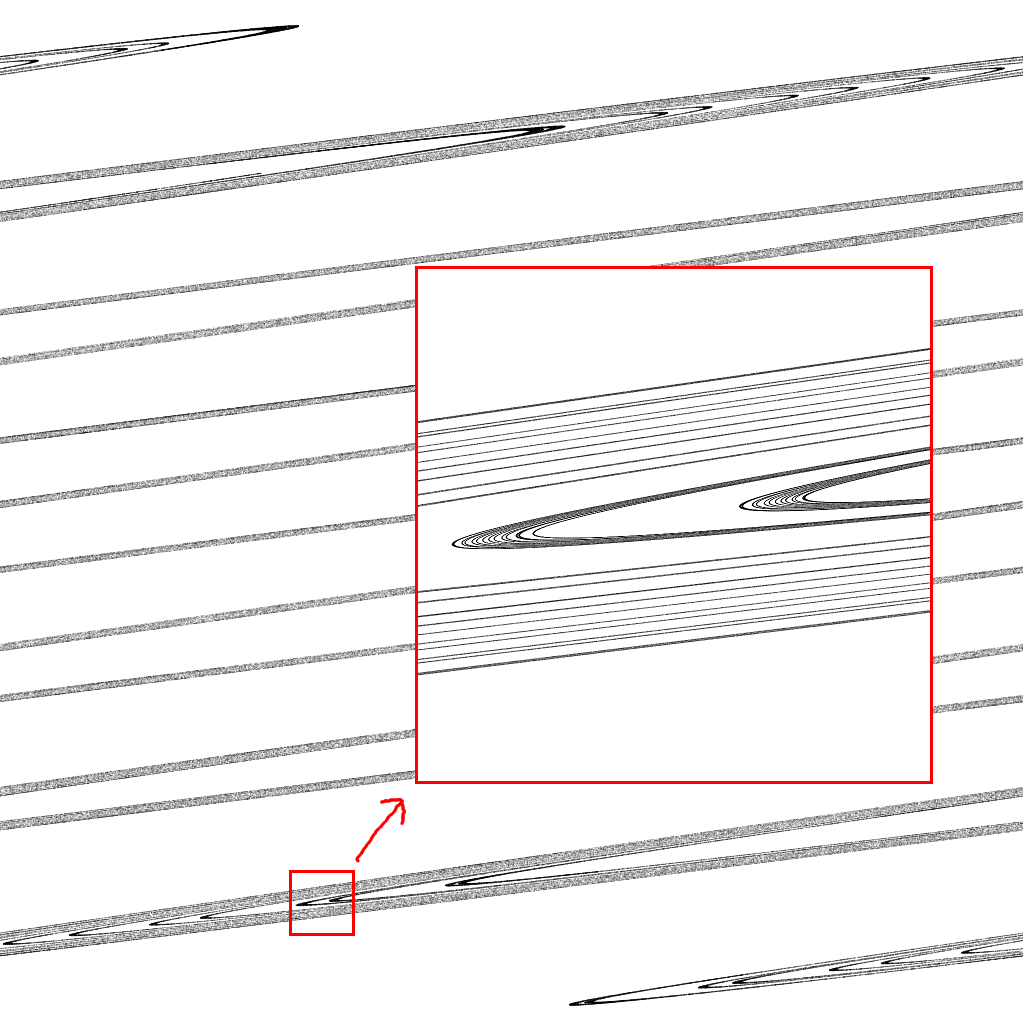
Zaslavskii map with parameters: $\epsilon=5, \nu=0.2, r=2.$

The Zaslavskii map is a discrete-time dynamical system introduced by George M. Zaslavsky. It is an example of a dynamical system that exhibits chaotic behavior. The Zaslavskii map takes a point ($x_n,y_n$) in the plane and maps it to a new point:

$$x_{n+1}=[x_n+\nu(1+\mu y_n)+\epsilon\nu\mu\cos(2\pi x_n)]\, (\textrm{mod}\,1)$$
$$y_{n+1}=e^{-r}(y_n+\epsilon\cos(2\pi x_n))\,$$

and

$$\mu = \frac{1-e^{-r}}{r}$$

where mod is the modulo operator with real arguments. The map depends on four constants ν, μ, ε and r. Russel (1980) gives a Hausdorff dimension of 1.39 but Grassberger (1983) questions this value based on their difficulties measuring the correlation dimension.

== See also ==
- List of chaotic maps
