= Katastrophe =

Katastrophe may refer to:

- Katastrophe (rapper) (born 1979), American rapper
- "Katastrophe", an episode of SWAT Kats: The Radical Squadron
- Katastrophe, a character in the comic book series Empowered

== See also ==
- Catastrophe (disambiguation)
- Katastrofe (Petter Bjørklund Kristiansen, born 1989), Norwegian singer and songwriter
