= Rifkat Bogdanov =

Soviet and Russian mathematician

Rifkat Ibragimovich Bogdanov (Russian: Рифка́т Ибраги́мович Богда́нов; June 13, 1950 – November 3, 2013) was a Soviet and Russian mathematician known for contributions to nonlinear dynamical systems, bifurcation theory, and differential geometry. He was an ethnic Tatar. In his work on bifurcations of limit cycles and versal deformations of singular points of vector fields (1975–76), he described a bifurcation of co-dimension 2, which has become known in the literature as the Bogdanov–Takens bifurcation.

Born in the village of Mamykovo in Tatarstan, Bogdanov had a doctorate under the supervision of Vladimir Arnold in physico-mathematical sciences and was a professor in two Russian research organizations: the Skobeltsyn Institute of Nuclear Physics at Lomonosov Moscow State University and the Department of Higher Mathematics at MATI — the Tsiolkovskii State Technological University.

== See also ==
- Bogdanov–Takens bifurcation

== Selected publications ==
- R. I. Bogdanov (1975). "Versal deformation of a singular point of a vector field with zero eigenvalues," Functional Analysis and Its Applications 9: 63 [in Russian].
- R. I. Bogdanov (1976). "Bifurcations of the limit cycle of a family of vector fields on a plane," Transactions I. G. Petrovskii Seminar, Moscow State University 2: 23–35 [in Russian; English translation in Selecta Mathematica Sovietica 1: 373–388, 1981].
- R. I. Bogdanov (1979). "Versal deformations of singular points of vector fields on a plane," Functional Analysis and Its Applications 13: 63–64 [in Russian; English translation available].
- R. I. Bogdanov (2003). Nonlinear Dynamical Systems on a Plane and Their Applications, Vuzovskaya Kniga Publishing House, Moscow [in Russian].
