= Transcritical bifurcation =

Particular kind of local bifurcation

In bifurcation theory, a field within mathematics, a transcritical bifurcation is a particular kind of local bifurcation, meaning that it is characterized by an equilibrium having an eigenvalue whose real part passes through zero.

The normal form of a transcritical bifurcation, where r ranges from −5 to 5.

A transcritical bifurcation is one in which a fixed point exists for all values of a parameter and is never destroyed. However, such a fixed point interchanges its stability with another fixed point as the parameter is varied. In other words, both before and after the bifurcation, there is one unstable and one stable fixed point. However, their stability is exchanged when they collide. So the unstable fixed point becomes stable and vice versa.

The normal form of a transcritical bifurcation is

$$\frac{dx}{dt} = rx - x^2.$$

This equation is similar to the logistic equation, but in this case we allow $r$ and $x$ to be positive or negative (while in the logistic equation $x$ and $r$ must be non-negative). The two fixed points are at $x = 0$ and $x = r$. When the parameter $r$ is negative, the fixed point at $x = 0$ is stable and the fixed point $x = r$ is unstable. But for $r>0$, the point at $x = 0$ is unstable and the point at $x = r$ is stable. So the bifurcation occurs at $r = 0$.

A typical example (in real life) could be the consumer-producer problem where the consumption is proportional to the (quantity of) resource.

For example:

$$\frac{dx}{dt} = rx(1 - x) - px,$$

where

- $rx(1 - x)$ is the logistic equation of resource growth; and
- $px$ is the consumption, proportional to the resource $x$.
