= Blue sky catastrophe =

The blue sky catastrophe is a form of orbital indeterminacy, and an element of bifurcation theory.

== Orbital dynamics ==
Blue sky catastrophe is a type of bifurcation of a periodic orbit. In other words, it describes a sort of behaviour stable solutions of a set of differential equations can undergo as the equations are gradually changed. This type of bifurcation is characterised by both the period and length of the orbit approaching infinity as the control parameter approaches a finite bifurcation value, but with the orbit still remaining within a bounded part of the phase space, and without loss of stability before the bifurcation point. In other words, the orbit vanishes into the blue sky.

== Applications of blue sky catastrophe in other fields ==
The bifurcation has found application in, amongst other places, slow-fast models of computational neuroscience. The possibility of the phenomenon was raised by David Ruelle and Floris Takens in 1971, and explored by R.L. Devaney and others in the following decade. More compelling analysis was not performed until the 1990s.

This bifurcation has also been found in the context of fluid dynamics, namely in double-diffusive convection of a small Prandtl number fluid. Double diffusive convection occurs when convection of the fluid is driven by both thermal and concentration gradients, and the temperature and concentration diffusivities take different values. The bifurcation is found in an orbit that is born in a global saddle-loop bifurcation, becomes chaotic in a period doubling cascade, and disappears in the blue sky catastrophe.
