= Tinkerbell map =

Discrete-time dynamical system in chaos theory

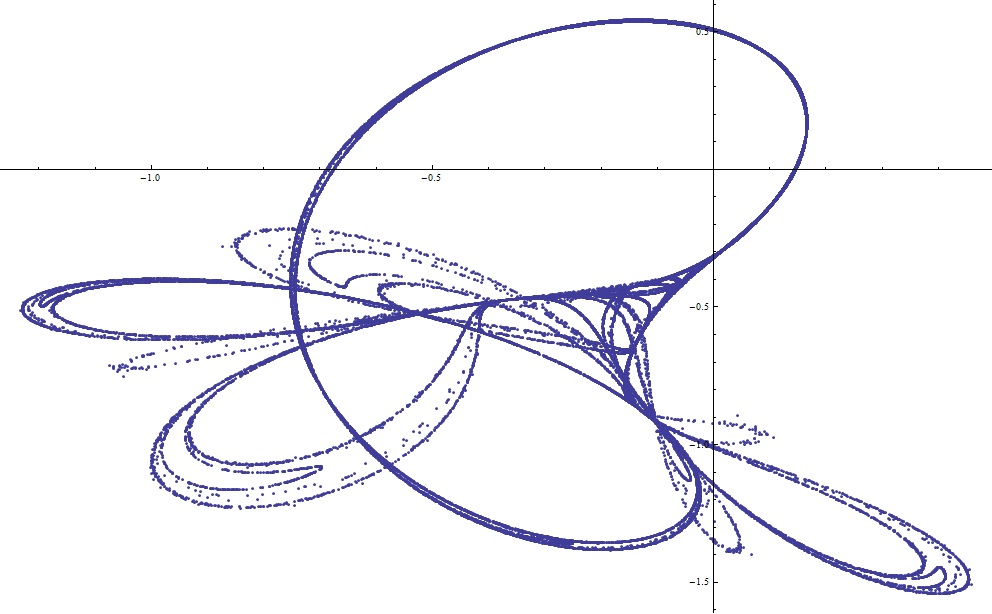
Tinkerbell attractor with a=0.9, b=-0.6013, c=2, d=0.5. Used starting values of $x_0 = -0.72$ and $y_0 = -0.64$.

The Tinkerbell map is a discrete-time dynamical system given by:

$$x_{n+1}=x_n^2-y_n^2+ax_n+by_n$$

$$y_{n+1}=2x_ny_n+cx_n+dy_n$$

Some commonly used values of a, b, c, and d are

- $a=0.9, b=-0.6013, c=2.0, d=0.50$
- $a=0.3, b=0.6000, c=2.0, d=0.27$

Like all chaotic maps, the Tinkerbell Map has also been shown to have periods; after a certain number of mapping iterations any given point shown in the map to the right will find itself once again at its starting location.

The origin of the name is uncertain; however, the graphical picture of the system (as shown to the right) shows a similarity to the movement of Tinker Bell over Cinderella Castle, as shown at the beginning of all films produced by Disney.

Tinkerbell attractor with a=0.9, b=-0.6013, c=2. Used starting values of Xo = -0.7, Yo= -0.6. I vary d value from 0.5 to 0.4.

== See also ==
- List of chaotic maps
