= Two-timing =

Two-timing can also refer to a mathematical technique of solving a second-order differential equation using two time variables, one identified as the "slow time", which provides the general movement of the background frame or course dynamics, and another called the "fast time", which captures the behavior of smaller, rapidly changing or oscillating structures.
