= Pitchfork bifurcation =

Bifurcation from a system having one fixed point to three fixed points

In bifurcation theory, a field within mathematics, a pitchfork bifurcation is a particular type of local bifurcation where the system transitions from one fixed point to three fixed points. Pitchfork bifurcations, like Hopf bifurcations, have two types – supercritical and subcritical.

In continuous dynamical systems described by ODEs—i.e. flows—pitchfork bifurcations occur generically in systems with symmetry.

== Supercritical case ==
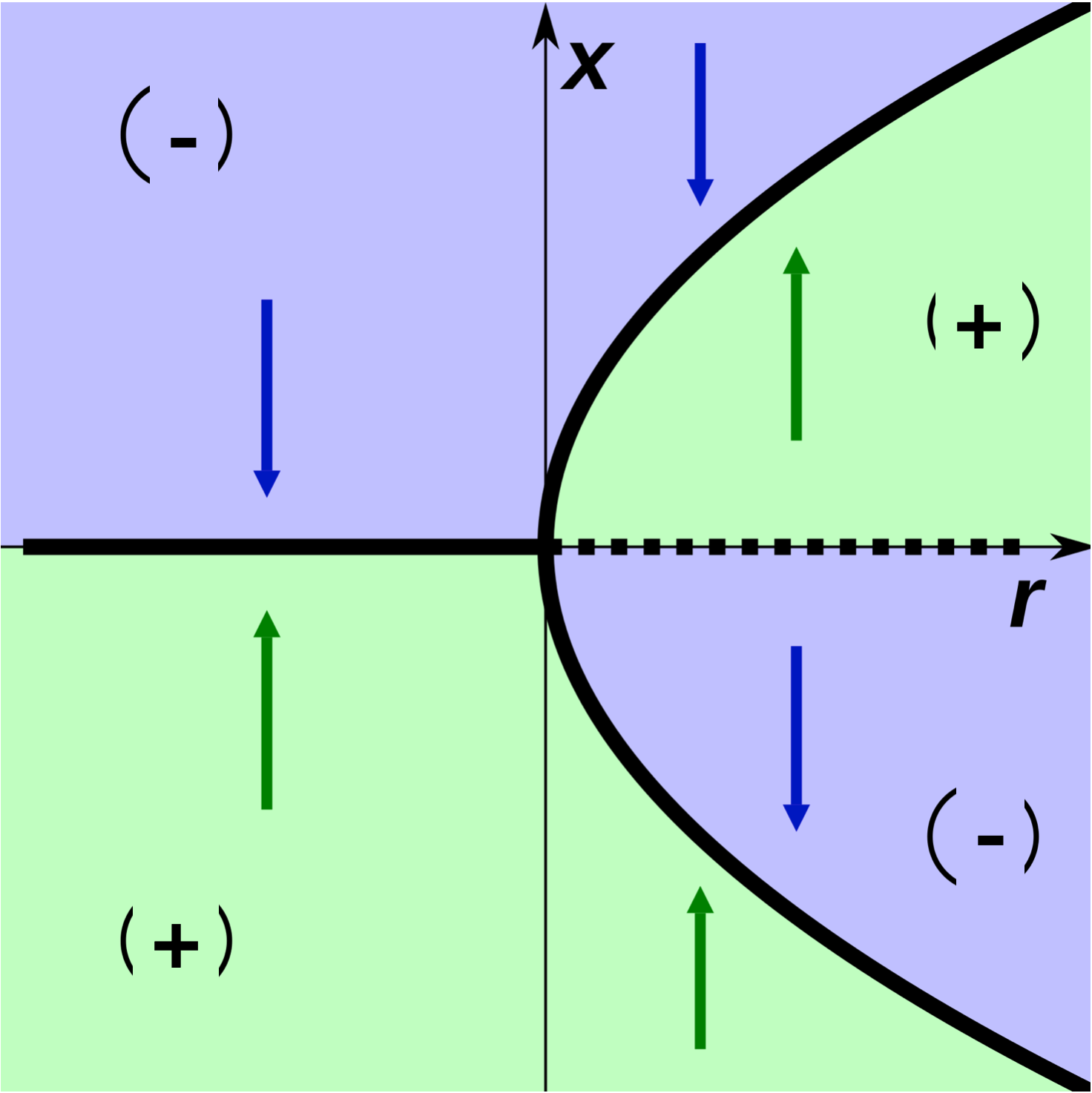
Supercritical case: solid lines represent stable points, while dotted line represents unstable one.

The normal form of the supercritical pitchfork bifurcation is

$$\frac{dx}{dt}=rx-x^3.$$

For $r<0$, there is one stable equilibrium at $x = 0$. For $r>0$ there is an unstable equilibrium at $x = 0$, and two stable equilibria at $x = \pm\sqrt{r}$.

== Subcritical case ==
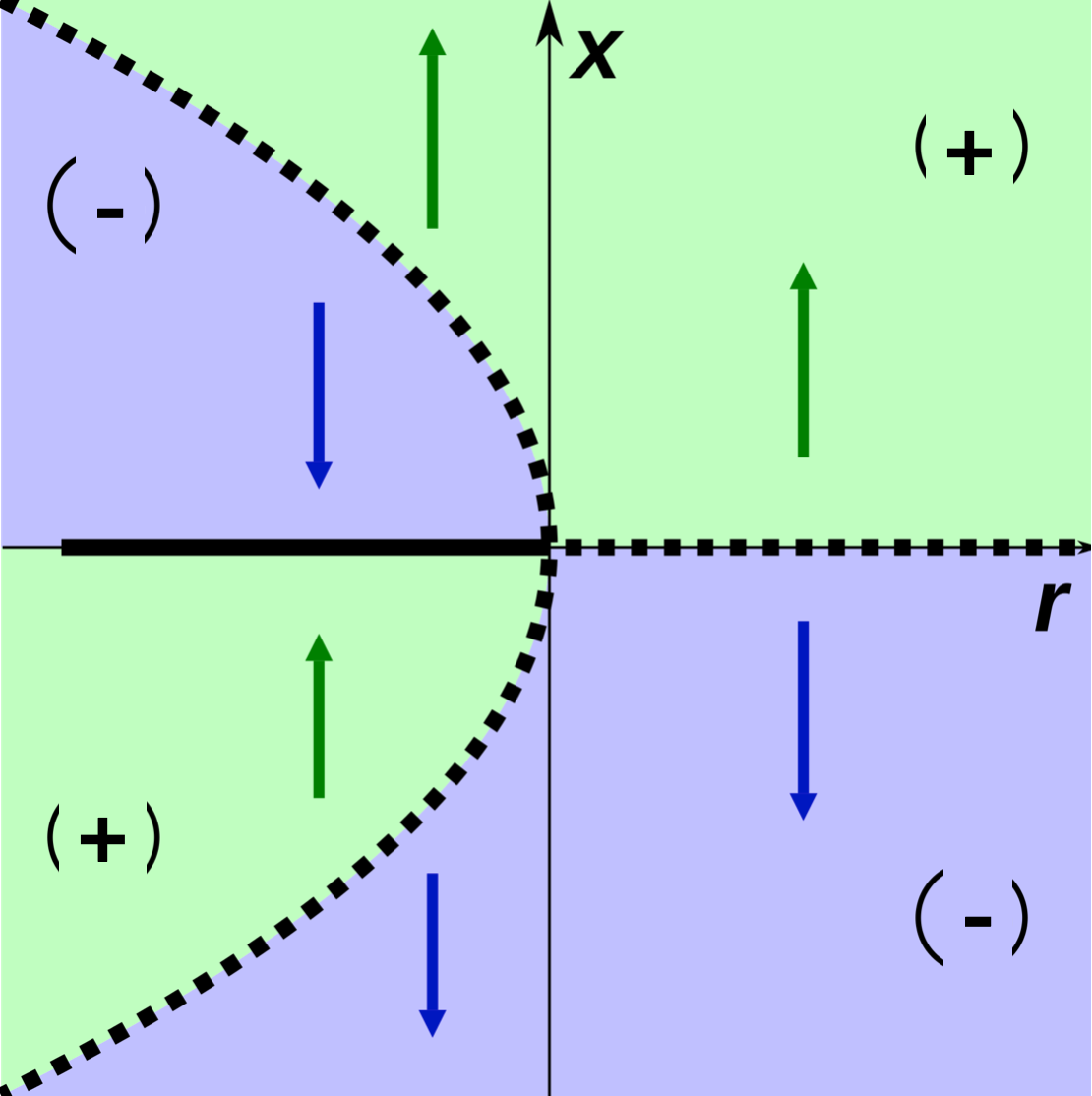
Subcritical case: solid line represents stable point, while dotted lines represent unstable ones.

The normal form for the subcritical case is

$$\frac{dx}{dt}=rx+x^3.$$

In this case, for $r<0$ the equilibrium at $x=0$ is stable, and there are two unstable equilibria at $x = \pm \sqrt{-r}$. For $r>0$ the equilibrium at $x=0$ is unstable.

== Formal definition ==
An ODE

$$\dot{x}=f(x,r)\,$$

described by a one parameter function $f(x, r)$ with $r \in \mathbb{R}$ satisfying:

$-f(x, r) = f(-x, r)\,\,$ (f is an odd function),

$$\begin{align}
\frac{\partial f}{\partial x}(0, r_0) &= 0, &
\frac{\partial^2 f}{\partial x^2}(0, r_0) &= 0, &
\frac{\partial^3 f}{\partial x^3}(0, r_0) &\neq 0, \\[5pt]
\frac{\partial f}{\partial r}(0, r_0) &= 0, &
\frac{\partial^2 f}{\partial x \partial r}(0, r_0) &\neq 0.
\end{align}$$

has a pitchfork bifurcation at $(x, r) = (0, r_0)$. The form of the pitchfork is given by the sign of the third derivative:

$$\frac{\partial^3 f}{\partial x^3}(0, r_0)\begin{cases}
< 0, & \text{supercritical} \\
> 0, & \text{subcritical}
\end{cases}
\,\,$$

Note that subcritical and supercritical describe the stability of the outer lines of the pitchfork (dashed or solid, respectively) and are not dependent on which direction the pitchfork faces. For example, the negative of the first ODE above, $\dot{x} = x^3 - rx$, faces the same direction as the first picture but reverses the stability and would hence be subcritical.

== See also ==
- Bifurcation theory
- Bifurcation diagram
