= Normal form (dynamical systems) =

In mathematics, the normal form of a dynamical system is a simplified form that can be useful in determining the system's behavior.

Normal forms are often used for determining local bifurcations in a system. All systems exhibiting a certain type of bifurcation are locally (around the equilibrium) topologically equivalent to the normal form of the bifurcation. For example, the normal form of a saddle-node bifurcation is

$$\frac{\mathrm{d}x}{\mathrm{d}t} = \mu + x^2$$

where $\mu$ is the bifurcation parameter. The transcritical bifurcation

$$\frac{\mathrm{d}x}{\mathrm{d}t} = r \ln x + x - 1$$

near $x=1$ can be converted to the normal form

$$\frac{\mathrm{d}u}{\mathrm{d}t} = R u - u^2 + O(u^3)$$

with the transformation $u = \frac{r}{2}(x -1), R = r + 1$.

See also canonical form for use of the terms canonical form, normal form, or standard form more generally in mathematics.
