= Biryukov equation =

Non-linear second-order differential equation

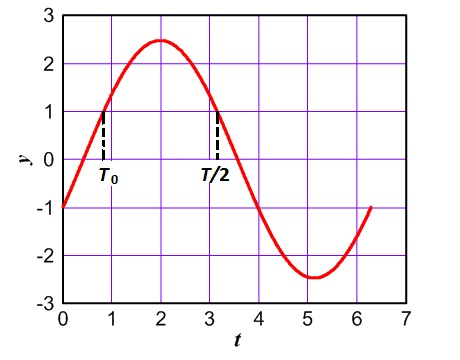
Sine oscillations F = 0.01

In the study of dynamical systems, the Biryukov equation (or Biryukov oscillator), named after Vadim Biryukov (1946), is a non-linear second-order differential equation used to model damped oscillators.

The equation is given by
$$\frac{d^2 y}{dt^2}+f(y)\frac{dy}{dt}+y=0, \qquad\qquad (1)$$

where ƒ(y) is a piecewise constant function which is positive, except for small y as

$$\begin{align}
& f(y) = \begin{cases} -F, & |y|\le Y_0; \\[4pt] F, & |y|>Y_0. \end{cases} \\[6pt]
& F = \text{const.} > 0, \quad Y_0 = \text{const.} > 0.
\end{align}$$

Eq. (1) is a special case of the Lienard equation; it describes the auto-oscillations.

Solution (1) at separate time intervals when f(y) is constant is given by

$$y_k(t) = A_{1,k}\exp(s_{1,k}t) + A_{2,k}\exp(s_{2,k}t) \qquad\qquad (2)$$

where exp denotes the exponential function. Here
$$s_k = \begin{cases}
\displaystyle \frac{F}{2}\mp\sqrt{ \left(\frac{F}{2}\right)^2-1}, & |y|<Y_0; \\[2pt]
\displaystyle -\frac{F}{2}\mp\sqrt{ \left(\frac{F}{2}\right)^2-1} & \text{otherwise.}
\end{cases}$$
Expression (2) can be used for real and complex values of s_{k}.

The first half-period’s solution at $y(0)=\pm Y_0$ is

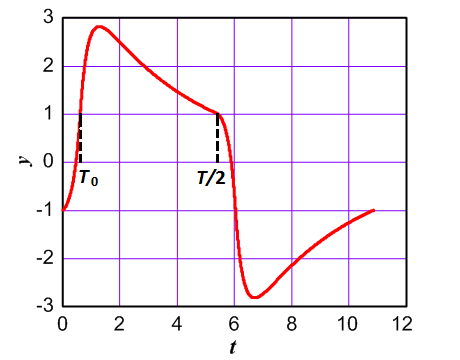
Relaxation oscillations F = 4

$$\begin{align}
y(t) &= \begin{cases}
y_1(t), & 0\le t<T_0; \\[4pt]
y_2(t), & \displaystyle T_0\le t< \frac{T}{2}. \end{cases} \\[4pt]
y_1(t) &= A_{1,k}\cdot \exp (s_{1,k}t)+A_{2,k}\cdot \exp (s_{2,k}t), \\[2pt]
y_2(t) &= A_{3,k}\cdot \exp(s_{3,k}t)+A_{4,k}\cdot \exp (s_{4,k}t).
\end{align}$$

The second half-period’s solution is

$$y(t)= \begin{cases}
\displaystyle -y_1\left(t-\frac{T}{2}\right), & \displaystyle \frac{T}{2} \le t < \frac{T}{2} + T_0; \\[4pt]
\displaystyle -y_2\left(t-\frac{T}{2}\right), & \displaystyle \frac{T}{2} +  T_0 \le t < T. \end{cases}$$

The solution contains four constants of integration A_{1}, A_{2}, A_{3}, A_{4}, the period T and the boundary T_{0} between y_{1}(t) and y_{2}(t) needs to be found. A boundary condition is derived from the continuity of y(t) and dy/dt.

Solution of (1) in the stationary mode thus is obtained by solving a system of algebraic equations as

$$\begin{array}{ll}
& y_1(0) = -Y_0 & y_1(T_0) = Y_0 \\[6pt]
& y_2(T_0) = Y_0 & y_2 \! \left(\tfrac{T}{2}\right) = Y_0 \\[6pt]
& \displaystyle \left.\frac{dy_1}{dt}\right|_{T_0} = \left.\frac{dy_2}{dt}\right|_{T_0} \qquad
& \displaystyle \left.\frac{dy_1}{dt}\right|_{0} = -\left.\frac{dy_2}{dt}\right|_\frac{T}{2}
\end{array}$$

The integration constants are obtained by the Levenberg–Marquardt algorithm. With $f(y)=\mu(-1+y^2)$, $\mu = \text{const.} > 0,$ Eq. (1) named Van der Pol oscillator. Its solution cannot be expressed by elementary functions in closed form.
