= Phase line =

A phase line may refer to:

- Phase line (mathematics), used to analyze autonomous ordinary differential equations
- Phase line (cartography), used to identify phases of military operations or changing borders over time
