= Liénard equation =

Family of second-order differential equations

In mathematics, more specifically in the study of dynamical systems and differential equations, a Liénard equation is a type of second-order ordinary differential equation named after the French physicist Alfred-Marie Liénard.

During the development of radio and vacuum tube technology, Liénard equations were intensely studied as they can be used to model oscillating circuits. Under certain additional assumptions Liénard's theorem guarantees the uniqueness and existence of a limit cycle for such a system. A Liénard system with piecewise-linear functions can also contain homoclinic orbits.

== Definition ==
Let f and g be two continuously differentiable functions on $\R,$ with f an even function and g an odd function. Then the second order ordinary differential equation of the form
$${d^2x \over dt^2} + f(x){dx \over dt} + g(x) = 0$$
is called a Liénard equation.

== Liénard system ==
The equation can be transformed into an equivalent two-dimensional system of ordinary differential equations. We define

$$F(x) := \int_0^x f(\xi) d\xi$$
$$x_1:= x$$
$$x_2:={dx \over dt} + F(x)$$

then

$$\begin{bmatrix}
\dot{x}_1 \\
\dot{x}_2
\end{bmatrix}
=
\mathbf{h}(x_1, x_2)
:=
\begin{bmatrix}
x_2 - F(x_1) \\
-g(x_1)
\end{bmatrix}$$

is called a Liénard system.

Alternatively, since the Liénard equation itself is also an autonomous differential equation, the substitution $v = {dx \over dt}$ leads the Liénard equation to become a first order differential equation:

$$v{dv \over dx}+f(x)v+g(x)=0$$

which is an Abel equation of the second kind.

== Example ==
The Van der Pol oscillator

$${d^2x \over dt^2}-\mu(1-x^2){dx \over dt} +x= 0$$

is a Liénard equation. The solution of a Van der Pol oscillator has a limit cycle. Such cycle has a solution of a Liénard equation with negative $f(x)$ at small $|x|$ and positive $f(x)$ otherwise. The Van der Pol equation has in general no exact, analytic solution. Such a solution for a limit cycle does exist if $f(x)$ is a constant piece-wise function.

== Liénard's theorem ==
A Liénard system has a unique and stable limit cycle surrounding the origin if it satisfies the following additional properties:

- g(x) > 0 for all x > 0;
- $\lim_{x \to \infty} F(x) := \lim_{x \to \infty} \int_0^x f(\xi) d\xi\ = \infty;$
- F(x) has exactly one positive root at some value p, where F(x) < 0 for 0 < x < p and F(x) > 0 and monotonic for x > p.

== See also ==
- Biryukov equation
