= Jinichi Nagumo =

Professor

Jinichi Nagumo (南雲仁一, 1926 -- March 10, 1999) was a professor at the University of Tokyo, known for his contributions to nonlinear dynamics, mathematical modeling of neural systems, nonlinear oscillation, and engineering. The FitzHugh–Nagumo model for neuron dynamics is named after him and Richard FitzHugh.
