= Integral curve =

Term in mathematics

In mathematics, an integral curve is a parametric curve that represents a specific solution to an ordinary differential equation or system of equations.

== Name ==
Integral curves are known by various other names, depending on the nature and interpretation of the differential equation or vector field. In physics, integral curves for an electric field or magnetic field are known as field lines, and integral curves for the velocity field of a fluid are known as streamlines. In dynamical systems, the integral curves for a differential equation that governs a system are referred to as trajectories or orbits.

== Definition ==
Suppose that F is a static vector field, that is, a vector-valued function with components (F_{1},F_{2},...,F_{n}) in a Cartesian coordinate system, and that x(t) is a parametric curve with Cartesian coordinates (x_{1}(t),x_{2}(t),...,x_{n}(t)). Then x(t) is an integral curve of F if it is a solution of the autonomous system of ordinary differential equations,

$$\begin{align}
\frac{dx_1}{dt} &= F_1(x_1,\ldots,x_n) \\
&\;\, \vdots \\
\frac{dx_n}{dt} &= F_n(x_1,\ldots,x_n).
\end{align}$$

Such a system may be written as a single vector equation,

$$\mathbf{x}'(t) = \mathbf{F}(\mathbf{x}(t)).$$

This equation says that the vector tangent to the curve at any point x(t) along the curve is precisely the vector F(x(t)), and so the curve x(t) is tangent at each point to the vector field F.

If a given vector field is Lipschitz continuous, then the Picard–Lindelöf theorem implies that there exists a unique flow for small time.

== Examples ==
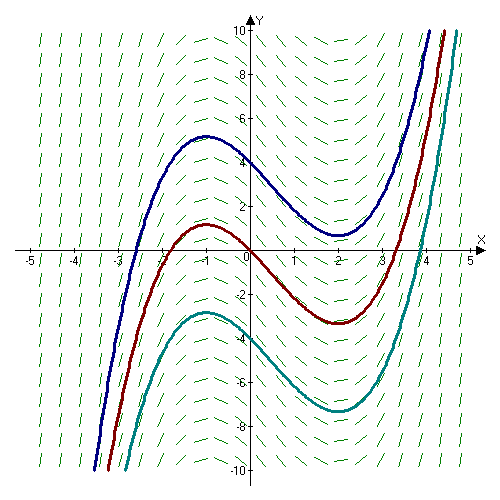
Three integral curves for the slope field corresponding to the differential equation dy / dx = x^{2} − x − 2.

If the differential equation is represented as a vector field or slope field, then the corresponding integral curves are tangent to the field at each point.

== Generalization to differentiable manifolds ==
=== Definition ===
Let M be a Banach manifold of class C^{r} with r ≥ 2. As usual, TM denotes the tangent bundle of M with its natural projection π_{M} : TM → M given by

$$\pi_M : (x, v) \mapsto x.$$

A vector field on M is a cross-section of the tangent bundle TM, i.e. an assignment to every point of the manifold M of a tangent vector to M at that point. Let X be a vector field on M of class C^{r−1} and let p ∈ M. An integral curve for X passing through p at time t_{0} is a curve α : J → M of class C^{r−1}, defined on an open interval J of the real line R containing t_{0}, such that

$$\begin{align}
\alpha(t_0) &= p; \\
\alpha' (t) &= X (\alpha (t)) \text{ for all } t \in J.
\end{align}$$

=== Relationship to ordinary differential equations ===
The above definition of an integral curve α for a vector field X, passing through p at time t_{0}, is the same as saying that α is a local solution to the ordinary differential equation/initial value problem

$$\begin{align}
\alpha(t_0) &= p; \\
\alpha' (t) &= X (\alpha (t)).
\end{align}$$

It is local in the sense that it is defined only for times in J, and not necessarily for all t ≥ t_{0} (let alone t ≤ t_{0}). Thus, the problem of proving the existence and uniqueness of integral curves is the same as that of finding solutions to ordinary differential equations/initial value problems and showing that they are unique.

=== Remarks on the time derivative ===
In the above, α′(t) denotes the derivative of α at time t, the "direction α is pointing" at time t. From a more abstract viewpoint, this is the Fréchet derivative:

$$(\mathrm{d}_t\alpha) (+1) \in \mathrm{T}_{\alpha (t)} M.$$

In the special case that M is some open subset of R^{n}, this is the familiar derivative

$$\left( \frac{\mathrm{d} \alpha_1}{\mathrm{d} t}, \dots, \frac{\mathrm{d} \alpha_n}{\mathrm{d} t} \right),$$

where α_{1}, ..., α_{n} are the coordinates for α with respect to the usual coordinate directions.

The same thing may be phrased even more abstractly in terms of induced maps. Note that the tangent bundle TJ of J is the trivial bundle J × R and there is a canonical cross-section ι of this bundle such that ι(t) = 1 (or, more precisely, (t, 1) ∈ ι) for all t ∈ J. The curve α induces a bundle map α_{∗} : TJ → TM so that the following diagram commutes:

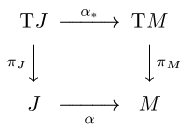

Then the time derivative α′ is the composition α′ = α_{∗} o ι, and α′(t) is its value at some point t ∈ J.
