= Phase curve =

Phase curve may refer to:

- Phase curve (astronomy) is the brightness of a reflecting body as a function of its phase angle.
- Phase response curve is the relationship between the timing and the effect of a treatment designed to affect circadian rhythms.
- Phase diagram is a type of chart used to show conditions at which thermodynamically distinct phases can occur at equilibrium.
- Phase angle (astronomy) is the angle between the light incident onto an observed object and the light reflected from the object.
- Phase line (mathematics) is a diagram that shows the behaviour of an autonomous ordinary differential equation
