= Phase portrait =

Plot of a dynamical system's trajectories in phase space

Potential energy and phase portrait of a simple pendulum. Note that the x-axis, being angular, wraps onto itself after every 2π radians.

Phase portrait of damped oscillator, with increasing damping strength. The equation of motion is $\ddot x + 2\gamma \dot x + \omega^2 x = 0.$

In mathematics, a phase portrait is a geometric representation of the orbits of a dynamical system in the phase plane. Each set of initial conditions is represented by a different point or curve.

Phase portraits are an invaluable tool in studying dynamical systems. They consist of a plot of typical trajectories in the phase space. This reveals information such as whether an attractor, a repellor or limit cycle is present for the chosen parameter value. The concept of topological equivalence is important in classifying the behaviour of systems by specifying when two different phase portraits represent the same qualitative dynamic behavior. An attractor is a stable point which is also called a "sink". The repeller is considered as an unstable point, which is also known as a "source".

A phase portrait graph of a dynamical system depicts the system's trajectories (with arrows) and stable steady states (with dots) and unstable steady states (with circles) in a phase space. The axes are of state variables.

== Examples ==
Illustration of how a phase portrait would be constructed for the motion of a simple pendulum

Phase portrait of van der Pol's equation, $\frac{d^2y}{dt^2}+\mu(y^2-1)\frac{dy}{dt}+y=0$.

- Simple pendulum, see picture (right).
- Simple harmonic oscillator where the phase portrait is made up of ellipses centred at the origin, which is a fixed point.
- Damped harmonic motion, see animation (right).
- Van der Pol oscillator see picture (bottom right).

== Visualizing the behavior of ordinary differential equations ==
A phase portrait represents the directional behavior of a system of ordinary differential equations (ODEs). The phase portrait can indicate the stability of the system.

Stability
Unstable	Most of the system's solutions tend towards ∞ over time
Asymptotically stable	All of the system's solutions tend to 0 over time
Neutrally stable	None of the system's solutions tend towards ∞ over time, but most solutions do not tend towards 0 either

The phase portrait behavior of a system of ODEs can be determined by the eigenvalues or the trace and determinant (trace = λ_{1} + λ_{2}, determinant = λ_{1}λ_{2}) of the system.

Phase portrait behavior
Eigenvalue, trace, determinant	Phase portrait shape
λ_{1} and λ_{2} are real and of opposite sign; Determinant < 0	Saddle (unstable)
λ_{1} and λ_{2} are real and of the same sign, and λ_{1} ≠ λ_{2}; 0 < determinant < (trace^{2} / 4)	Node (stable if trace < 0, unstable if trace > 0)
λ_{1} and λ_{2} have both a real and imaginary component; (trace^{2} / 4) < determinant	Spiral (stable if trace < 0, unstable if trace > 0)

== See also ==
- Phase space
- Phase plane
