= Node (autonomous system) =

The behaviour of a linear autonomous system around a critical point is a node if the following conditions are satisfied:

Each path converges to or away from the critical point (dependent of the underlying equation) as $t \rightarrow \infty$ (or as $t \rightarrow - \infty$). Furthermore, each path approaches the point asymptotically through a line.
