= Leon Glass =

American scientist (born 1943)

- Born: March 29, 1943 (age 83); Brooklyn, New York
- Education: Brooklyn College; University of Chicago
- Awards: Guggenheim Fellowship (1994); Royal Society of Canada Fellow (1998); American Physical Society Fellow (1999); Society for Industrial and Applied Mathematics Fellow (2009)
- Scientific career
- Workplaces: University of Edinburgh; University of Chicago; University of Rochester; McGill University
- Doctoral advisor: Stuart Rice

Leon Glass (born 1943) is an American scientist who has studied various aspects of the application of mathematical and physical methods to biology, with special interest in vision, cardiac arrhythmia, and genetic networks.

== Biography ==
Leon Glass was born in Brooklyn, NY where he attended Erasmus Hall High School (Class of 1959) and majored in Chemistry at Brooklyn College (Class of 1963). He obtained a Ph.D. in Chemistry in 1968 from the University of Chicago studying theory of atomic motions in simple liquids. Glass was a postdoctoral fellow in machine intelligence and perception (University of Edinburgh), theoretical biology (University of Chicago), and physics and astronomy (University of Rochester).

In 1975, Glass joined the department of physiology at McGill University, where he is professor emeritus and the Isadore Rosenfeld chair in Cardiology. He was awarded a Guggenheim Fellowship in 1994 and is a Fellow of the Royal Society of Canada (1998), the American Physical Society (1999), and the Society for Industrial and Applied Mathematics (2009). Leon Glass is a father of two and lives in Montreal, Canada.

Glass is also a French horn player, and is part of the executive committee of the I Medici di McGill Orchestra, an orchestra consisting mainly of McGill University's medical students and professors.

== Work ==
Glass' early work and eponymous patterns were fostered by mentor Christopher Longuet-Higgins, who guided him in the application of statistical methods to visual perception. Glass patterns are formed from superimposed random dot patterns: an original image with a second image which has been generated through a linear or nonlinear transformation of the original. A variety of different spatial patterns such as circles, spirals, hyperbolae, can be perceived in the superimposed image set, depending on the nature of the transformation between the two sets of dots. This discovery provided insight into mathematical nature of human perception by suggesting that the visual cortex is capable of computing a large number of autocorrelations in parallel.

David Marr first coined the term "Glass patterns" in his 1982 work on visual perception, resulting in an increased interest in the phenomenon. Because of their mathematical simplicity and physiological underpinnings, Glass patterns have subsequently been used in dozens of electrophysiology and visual psychophysics experiments, resulting in additional understanding of the physiology of visual perception.

Glass may be best known for his work with colleagues at McGill University, suggesting that certain physiological disorders may be considered dynamical diseases. These are characterized by sudden changes in the qualitative dynamics of a physiological control mechanism, which leads to disease. These features are illustrated in the Mackey-Glass equations. According to James Gleick, who recounted conversations with Glass in his book Chaos: Making a New Science, foundational work in chaos by the McGill group was performed using animal models. He quotes Glass saying: "Many different rhythms can be established between a stimulus and a little piece of chicken heart". Since the initial description of dynamical diseases, a large number of researchers have analyzed mathematical models of physiological systems. Examples of dynamical diseases have been described in medical fields as diverse as hematology, cardiology, neurology, and psychiatry. Dynamical disease modeling has been used to understand cardiac arrhythmia, and specific model detection algorithms are now being programmed into pacemakers so that pathological patterns can be detected and corrected.

== Publications ==
Books

- Glass, Leon; Mackey, Michael C. (1988). From Clocks to Chaos: The Rhythms of Life. Princeton University Press. ISBN 978-0-691-08496-1.
  (Translated into Russian (1991), Chinese (1995), Portuguese (1997)).
- Daniel Kaplan; Leon Glass (1995). Understanding Nonlinear Dynamics. Springer-Verlag. ISBN 978-0-387-94440-1.

Selected articles

- Glass, Leon (1969). "Moire effect from random dots". Nature. 223 (5206): 578–580. Bibcode:1969Natur.223..578G. doi:10.1038/223578a0. PMID 5799528. S2CID 4267348.
- Glass, Leon; Kauffman, Stuart (1973). "The logical analysis of continuous, non-linear biochemical control networks". Journal of Theoretical Biology. 39 (1): 103–129. Bibcode:1973JThBi..39..103G. doi:10.1016/0022-5193(73)90208-7. PMID 4741704.
- Mackey, Michael C.; Glass, Leon (1977). "Oscillation and chaos in physiological control systems". Science. 197 (4300): 287–289. Bibcode:1977Sci...197..287M. doi:10.1126/science.267326. hdl:10338.dmlcz/127762. PMID 267326.
- Guevara, Michael R.; Glass, Leon; Shrier, Alvin (1981). "Phase locking, period-doubling bifurcations, and irregular dynamics in periodically stimulated cardiac cells". Science. 214 (4527): 1350–1353. Bibcode:1981Sci...214.1350G. doi:10.1126/science.7313693. PMID 7313693.
- Glass, Leon (2001). "Synchronization and rhythmic processes in physiology". Nature. 410 (6825): 277–284. Bibcode:2001Natur.410..277G. doi:10.1038/35065745. PMID 11258383. S2CID 4379463.
