= Isocline =

Type of curve on a plane

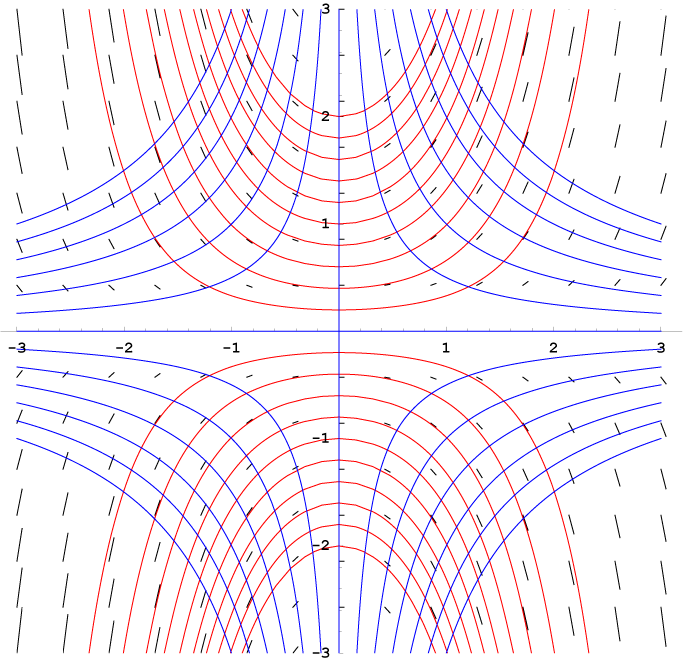
Fig. 1: Isoclines (blue), slope field (black), and some solution curves (red) of y' = xy. The solution curves are $y = C e^{x^2/2}$.

Given a family of curves, assumed to be differentiable, an isocline for that family is formed by the set of points at which some member of the family attains a given slope. The word comes from the Greek words ἴσος (isos), meaning "same", and the κλίνειν (klenein), meaning "make to slope". Generally, an isocline will itself have the shape of a curve or the union of a small number of curves.

Isoclines are often used as a graphical method of solving ordinary differential equations. In an equation of the form y' = f(x, y), the isoclines are lines in the (x, y) plane obtained by setting f(x, y) equal to a constant. This gives a series of lines (for different constants) along which the solution curves have the same gradient. By calculating this gradient for each isocline, the slope field can be visualised; making it relatively easy to sketch approximate solution curves; as in fig. 1.

== Other uses ==
In population dynamics, the term "zero-growth isocline" refers to the set of population sizes at which the rate of change for one population in a pair of interacting populations is zero. However, this is rare and a more common term is nullcline.
