= Ball and beam =

Mechanical model of the ball and beam system

The ball and beam system consists of a long beam which can be tilted by a servo or electric motor together with a ball rolling back and forth on top of the beam. It is a popular textbook example in control theory.

The significance of the ball and beam system is that it is a simple system which is open-loop unstable. Even if the beam is restricted to be very nearly horizontal, without active feedback, it will swing to one side or the other, and the ball will roll off the end of the beam. To stabilize the ball, a control system which measures the position of the ball and adjusts the beam accordingly must be used.

In two dimensions, the ball and beam system becomes the ball and plate system, where a ball rolls on top of a plate whose inclination can be adjusted by tilting it forwards, backwards, leftwards, or rightwards.
