= Mackey–Glass equations =

Nonlinear time delay differential equation

In mathematics and mathematical biology, the Mackey–Glass equations, named after Michael Mackey and Leon Glass, refer to a family of delay differential equations whose behaviour manages to mimic both healthy and pathological behaviour in certain biological contexts, controlled by the equation's parameters. Originally, they were used to model the variation in the relative quantity of mature cells in the blood. The equations are defined as:

$\frac{dP(t)}{dt} = \frac{\beta_0 \theta^n}{\theta^n + P(t - \tau)^n} - \gamma P(t)$	Eq. 1

and

$\frac{dP(t)}{dt} = \frac{\beta_0 \theta^n P(t - \tau)}{\theta^n + P(t - \tau)^n} - \gamma P(t)$	Eq. 2

where $P(t)$ represents the density of cells over time, and $\beta_0, \theta, n, \tau, \gamma$ are parameters of the equations.

Equation (2), in particular, is notable in dynamical systems since it can result in chaotic attractors with various dimensions.

== Introduction ==
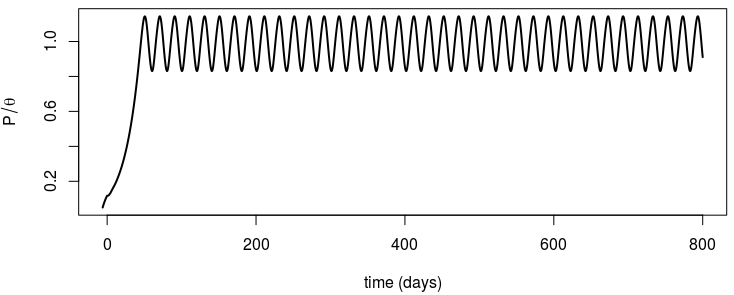
Time series generated from the Mackey–Glass equations. This can be seen as modelling a healthy variation of blood cell density. Here, $\tau = 6$.

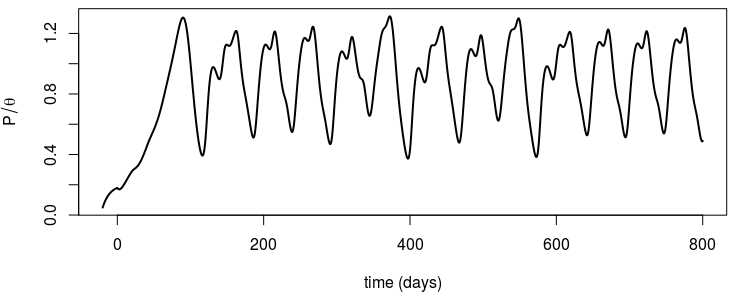
Also generated from the Mackey–Glass equations, but now could be seen as pathological blood cell density variation. Here, $\tau = 20$.

There exist an enormous number of physiological systems that involve or rely on the periodic behaviour of certain subcomponents of the system. For example, many homeostatic processes rely on negative feedback to control the concentration of substances in the blood; breathing, for instance, is promoted when the brain detects high CO_{2} levels in the blood. One way to model such systems mathematically is with the following simple ordinary differential equation:

$$y'(t) = k - c y(t)$$

where $k$ is the rate at which a "substance" is produced, and $c$ controls how the current level of the substance discourages the continuation of its production. The solutions of this equation can be found via an integrating factor, and have the form:

$$y(t) = \frac{k}{c} + f(y_0) e^{- c t}$$

where $y_0$ is any initial condition for the initial value problem.

However, the above model assumes that variations in the substance concentration is detected immediately, which often not the case in physiological systems. In order to ease this problem, Mackey, M.C. & Glass, L. (1977) proposed changing the production rate to a function $k(y(t - \tau))$ of the concentration at an earlier point $t - \tau$ in time, in hope that this would better reflect the fact that there is a significant delay before the bone marrow produces and releases mature cells in the blood, after detecting low cell concentration in the blood. By taking the production rate $k$ as being:

$$\frac{\beta_0 \theta^n}{\theta^n + P(t - \tau)^n} ~~ \text{ or } ~~ \frac{\beta_0 \theta^n P(t - \tau)}{\theta^n + P(t - \tau)^n}$$

we obtain Equations (1) and (2), respectively. The values used by Mackey, M.C. & Glass, L. (1977) were $\gamma = 0.1$, $\beta_0 = 0.2$ and $n = 10$, with initial condition $P(0) = 0.1$. The value of $\theta$ is not relevant for the purpose of analyzing the dynamics of Equation (2), since the change of variable $P(t) = \theta \cdot Q(t)$ reduces the equation to:

$$Q'(t) = \frac{\beta_0 Q(t - \tau)}{1 + Q(t - \tau)^n} - \gamma Q(t).$$

This is why, in this context, plots often place $Q(t) = P(t) / \theta$ in the $y$-axis.

== Dynamical behaviour ==
Mackey–Glass attractors for various values of the parameter $\tau$

It is of interest to study the behaviour of the equation solutions when $\tau$ is varied, since it represents the time taken by the physiological system to react to the concentration variation of a substance. An increase in this delay can be caused by a pathology, which in turn can result in chaotic solutions for the Mackey–Glass equations, especially Equation (2). When $\tau = 6$, we obtain a very regular periodic solution, which can be seen as characterizing "healthy" behaviour; on the other hand, when $\tau = 20$ the solution gets much more erratic.

The Mackey–Glass attractor can be visualized by plotting the pairs $(P(t), P(t - \tau))$. This is somewhat justified because delay differential equations can (sometimes) be reduced to a system of ordinary differential equations, and also because they are approximately infinite dimensional maps.

== See also ==
- Circadian rhythm
- Circadian oscillator
- Neural oscillation
