= Phase line (mathematics) =

Diagram used to analyze autonomous ordinary differential equations

A plot of $f(y)$ (left) and its phase line (right). In this case, a and c are both sinks and b is a source.

In mathematics, a phase line is a diagram that shows the qualitative behaviour of an autonomous ordinary differential equation in a single variable, $\tfrac{dy}{dx}=f(y)$. The phase line is the 1-dimensional form of the general $n$-dimensional phase space, and can be readily analyzed.

== Diagram ==
A line, usually vertical, represents an interval of the domain of the derivative. The critical points (i.e., roots of the derivative $\tfrac{dy}{dx}$, points $y$ such that $f(y) = 0$) are indicated, and the intervals between the critical points have their signs indicated with arrows: an interval over which the derivative is positive has an arrow pointing in the positive direction along the line (up or right), and an interval over which the derivative is negative has an arrow pointing in the negative direction along the line (down or left). The phase line is identical in form to the line used in the first derivative test, other than being drawn vertically instead of horizontally, and the interpretation is virtually identical, with the same classification of critical points.

== Examples ==
The simplest examples of a phase line are the trivial phase lines, corresponding to functions $f(y)$ which do not change sign: if $f(y) = 0$, every point is a stable equilibrium ($y$ does not change); if $f(y) > 0$ for all $y$, then $y$ is always increasing, and if $f(y) < 0$ then $y$ is always decreasing.

The simplest non-trivial examples are the exponential growth model/decay (one unstable/stable equilibrium) and the logistic growth model (two equilibria, one stable, one unstable).

== Classification of critical points ==
A critical point can be classified as stable, unstable, or semi-stable (equivalently, sink, source, or node), by inspection of its neighbouring arrows.

If both arrows point toward the critical point, it is stable (a sink): nearby solutions will converge asymptotically to the critical point, and the solution is stable under small perturbations, meaning that if the solution is disturbed, it will return to (converge to) the solution.

If both arrows point away from the critical point, it is unstable (a source): nearby solutions will diverge from the critical point, and the solution is unstable under small perturbations, meaning that if the solution is disturbed, it will not return to the solution.

Otherwise – if one arrow points towards the critical point, and one points away – it is semi-stable (a node): it is stable in one direction (where the arrow points towards the point), and unstable in the other direction (where the arrow points away from the point).

== See also ==
- First derivative test, analog in elementary differential calculus
- Phase plane, 2-dimensional form
- Phase space, $n$-dimensional form
