= Nullcline =

Curves on which differential equations are zero

In mathematical analysis, nullclines, sometimes called zero-growth isoclines, are encountered in a system of ordinary differential equations

$$x_1'=f_1(x_1, \ldots, x_n)$$
$x_2'=f_2(x_1, \ldots, x_n)$

$$\vdots$$

$$x_n'=f_n(x_1, \ldots, x_n)$$

where $x'$ here represents a derivative of $x$ with respect to another parameter, such as time $t$. The $j$'th nullcline is the geometric shape for which $x_j'=0$. The equilibrium points of the system are located where all of the nullclines intersect. In a two-dimensional linear system, the nullclines can be represented by two lines on a two-dimensional plot; in a general two-dimensional system they are arbitrary curves. Nullclines are useful for visualization in phase plane plot analysis. Nullclines split the plot into regions of potentially similar dynamics.

== History ==
The definition, though with the name 'directivity curve', was used in a 1967 article by Endre Simonyi. This article also defined 'directivity vector' as $\mathbf{w} = \mathrm{sign}(P)\mathbf{i} + \mathrm{sign}(Q)\mathbf{j}$, where $P$ and $Q$ are the $dx/dt$ and $dy/dt$ differential equations, and $i$ and $j$ are the $x$ and $y$ direction unit vectors.

Simonyi developed a new stability test method from these new definitions, and with it he studied differential equations. This method, beyond the usual stability examinations, provided semi-quantitative results.

== See also ==
- Critical point (mathematics)

== Notes ==
- E. Simonyi – M. Kaszás: Method for the Dynamic Analysis of Nonlinear Systems, Periodica Polytechnica Chemical Engineering – Chemisches Ingenieurwesen, Polytechnical University Budapest, 1969
