= List of Delft University of Technology faculty =

This is an incomplete list of notable faculty at TU Delft .

== B ==
- Jan Hendrik de Boer, developer of crystal bar process
- Johannes M. Bauer, Austrian communications professor
- Johannes Bosscha, Dutch physicist and former director of TU Delft
- Jacob B. Bakema, Dutch architect
- Frits Bolkestein, Dutch politician and former European Commissioner
- Nicolaas Govert de Bruijn, Dutch mathematician, known for De Bruijn graph and De Bruijn index
- Martinus Willem Beijerinck, Dutch microbiologist and botanist and founder of virology
- Jan Burgers, Dutch physicist, known for Burgers' equation and Burgers vector

== C ==
- Jo Coenen, Dutch architect
- Dirk Coster, Dutch physicist, co-founder of Hafnium

== D ==
- Jan Dietz, Dutch computer scientist
- David van Dantzig, Dutch mathematician and co-founder of National Research Institute for Mathematics and Computer Science
- Cees Dekker, Dutch scientist known for research on carbon nanotubes and molecular biophysics

== E ==
- Wiktor Eckhaus, Dutch mathematician known for Eckhaus instability and Eckhaus equation
- Berend George Escher, Dutch geologist and former rector magnificus of University of Leiden
- Aldo van Eyck, Dutch architect
- Bruno Ninaber van Eyben, Dutch jewellery and industrial designer; designed the last series of Dutch guilder coins and the obverse side of all circulating Dutch euro coins

== F ==
- Bent Flyvbjerg, Danish urban planner
- Tony Fretton, British architect

== G ==
- Johannes De Groot, Dutch mathematician
- Marinus Jan Granpré Molière, Dutch architect

== H ==
- Majid Hassanizadeh, Iranian hydrogeologist
- Wander Johannes de Haas, Discoverer of Einstein–de Haas effect
- Francine Houben, Dutch architect, co-founder of Mecanoo architects bureau
- Vic Hayes, Dutch policy maker, father of WiFi
- Herman Hertzberger, Dutch architect

== K ==
- Albert Jan Kluyver, a father of comparative microbiology
- Hendrik Anthony Kramers, co-founder of National Research Institute for Mathematics and Computer Science
- Gijs Kuenen, Dutch microbiologist
- Warner T. Koiter, Dutch mechanical engineer
- Heike Kamerlingh Onnes, Dutch Nobel laureate in Physics, a discoverer of superconductivity
- Ralph Kronig, German-American physicist and discoverer of particle spin
- Alexander Rinnooy Kan, Dutch mathematician and economist
- Marc Koehler, Dutch architect
- Frederik H. Kreuger, Dutch high voltage scientist and inventor
- Alexander Rinnooy Kan, Dutch mathematician and business leader

== L ==
- D.G.H. Latzko, Austrian-born Dutch mechanical enigeer
- Rehuel Lobatto, Dutch mathematician known for Gauss–Lobatto quadrature method
- Harry Lintsen, Dutch professor of history of technology

== M ==
- Paul Mijksenaar, industrial designer, developer of visual information systems for John F. Kennedy International, LaGuardia and Schiphol airports
- Gustaaf Adolf Frederik Molengraaff, Dutch geologist and discoverer of Bushveld complex
- Marinus Jan Granpré Molière, Dutch architect, founder of Traditionalist School
- Winy Maas, Dutch architect

== O ==
- Wubbo Ockels, Dutch astronaut, STS-61A Challenger crew member
- Kas Oosterhuis, Dutch architect
- Ootje Oxenaar, Dutch graphic designer

== P ==
- Hendrik Jacobus Prins, discoverer of the Prins reaction
- Willem van der Poel, Dutch computer scientist
- Hans B. Pacejka, Dutch expert in vehicle system dynamics
- Balthasar van der Pol, Dutch electrical engineer
- Dirk Polder, Dutch physicist known for Casimir-Polder force

== R ==
- Carmona Rodrigues, former mayor of Lisbon
- Hendrik van Riessen, Dutch philosopher
- Bob Van Reeth, Belgian architect
- Hendrik van Riessen, Dutch reformational philosopher
- Jacob van Rijs, Dutch architect

== S ==
- Henk G. Sol, Dutch organizational theorist
- Dirk Jan Struik, Dutch-American mathematician
- Thomas Joannes Stieltjes, Dutch mathematician and founder of Riemann–Stieltjes integral
- Egbert Schuurman, Dutch reformation philosopher
- Jan Arnoldus Schouten, Dutch mathematician

== T ==
- Antonia Terzi, Italian aerodynamicist
- Bernard Tellegen, Dutch electrical engineer, inventor of penthode and gyrator
- Alexander Tzonis, Greek architect

== U ==
- Johannes Herman Frederik Umbgrove, Dutch geologist

== V ==
- Marc de Vries, Dutch technologist
- Henk van der Vorst, Dutch mathematician
- Cees Veerman, Dutch politician
- Jacq Firmin Vogelaar, Dutch novelist
- Felix Andries Vening Meinesz, Dutch geophysicist and geodesist

== W ==
- Aaldert Wapstra, Dutch physicist
- Ludwig Oswald Wenckebach, Dutch sculptor

== Z ==
- Friso de Zeeuw, Dutch politician
- Andy Zaidman, Professor Object Oriented Programming
- Guoqi Zhang, Academic staff and engineer
