= Architecture of the Netherlands =

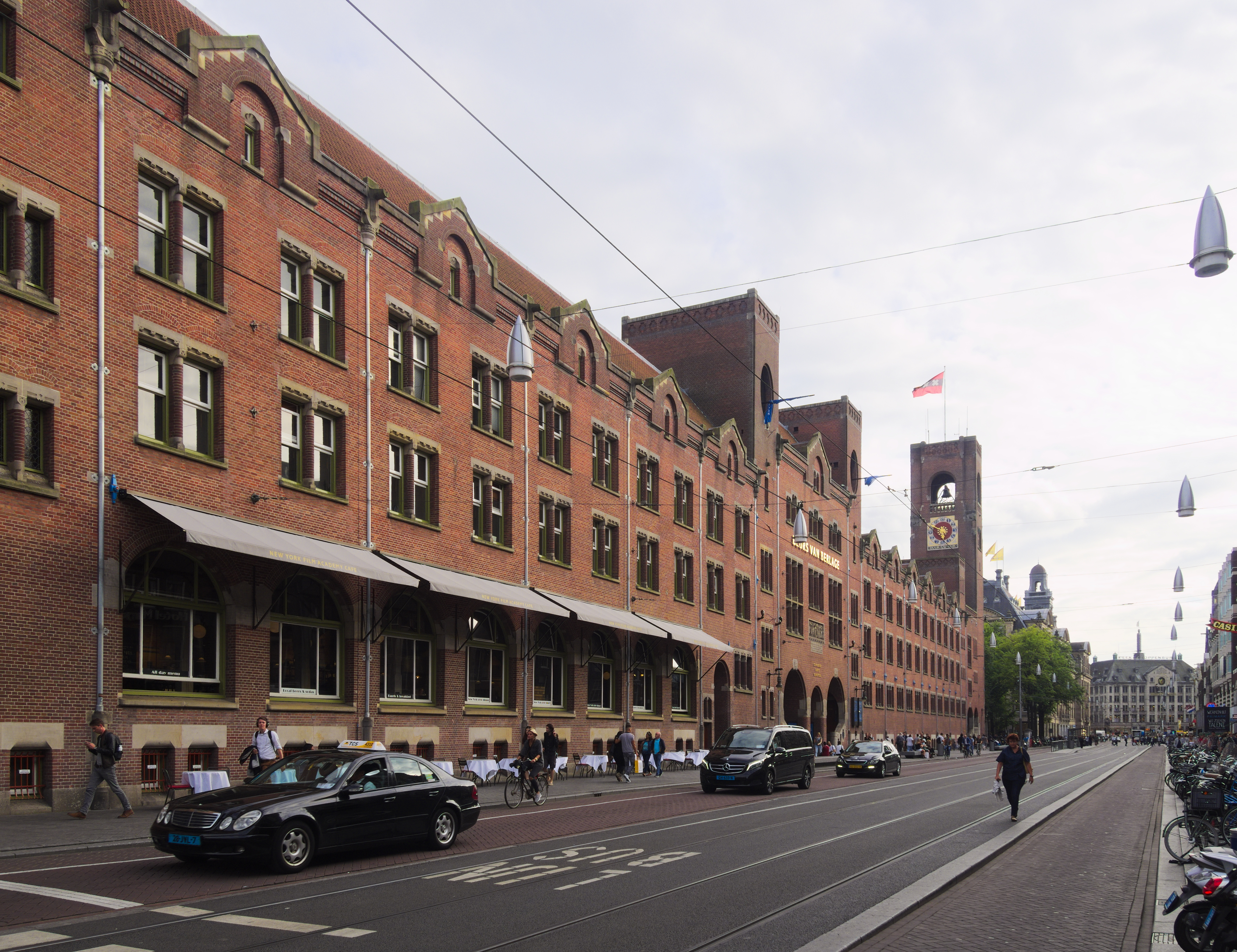
The Beurs van Berlage, built by Hendrik Petrus Berlage in 1903.

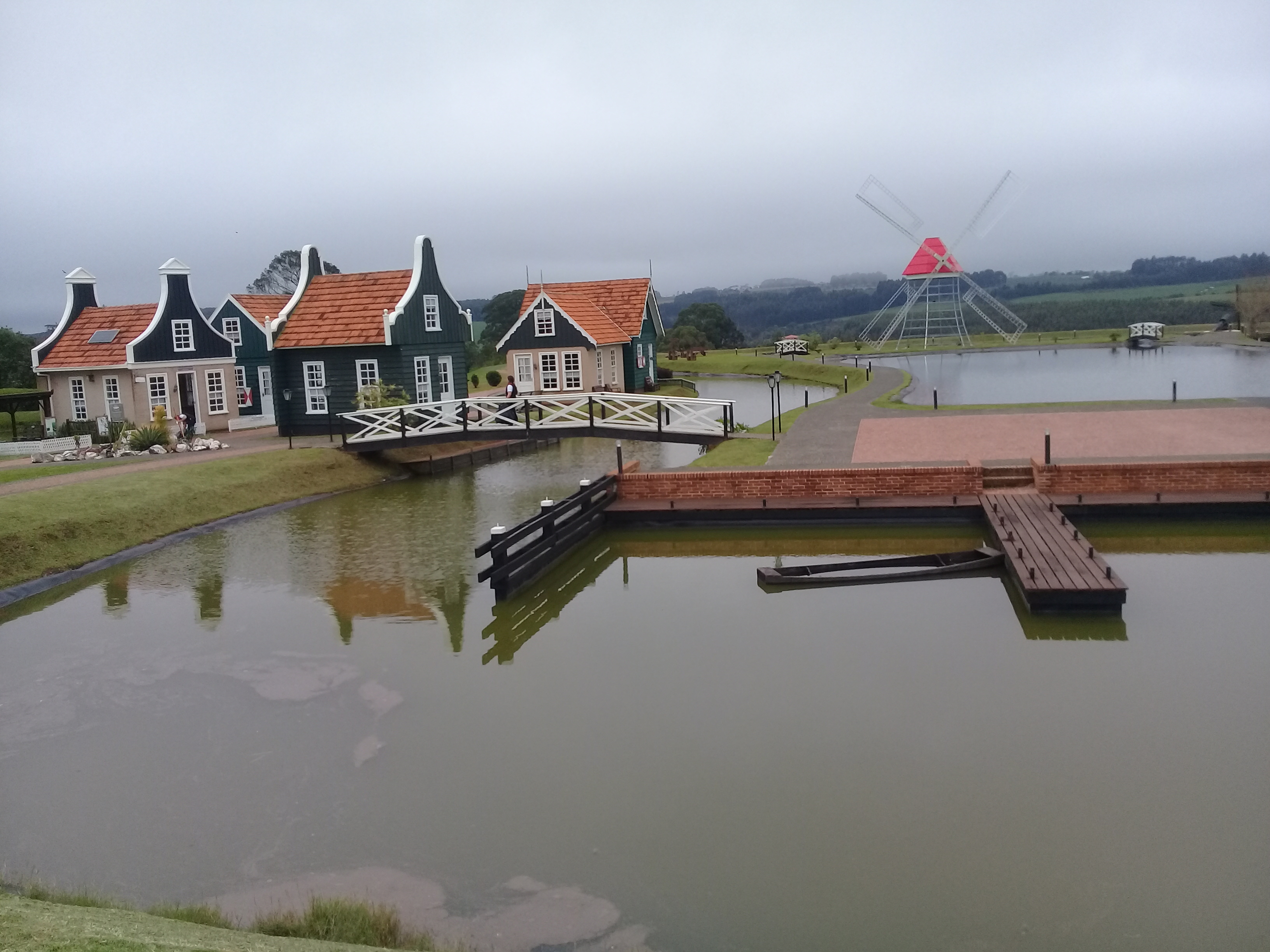
View of the Carambeí Historical Park mill and houses in Dutch architecture on the left

Dutch architecture includes the history of architecture within the current territory of the Netherlands, thereby excluding Belgium, which is often included in the broader term "the Low Countries". The distinct character of Dutch architecture was long denied; however, the richness of architectural creation in the Netherlands from the Middle Ages to the present day proves otherwise. Up until the 19th century, architecture in the Netherlands shared significant similarities with that of Flanders, as these two regions had a common culture until the Renaissance. Nevertheless, Protestant, commercial, pastoral, and free Holland since the 17th century does not resemble Catholic, industrious Flanders, which was long subjected to foreign rule. More concretely, unlike Flemish architecture, the use of stone in construction in the Netherlands has always been limited, as it is found only in very small quantities in the territory. This scarcity pushed the Dutch to adapt to an architecture primarily based on brick, which was even used in road paving.

Although Dutch architecture cannot be reduced to a particular style, it is distinguished by its practical spirit and rejection of superfluity — a trait developed due to the unique context in which it evolved. The Netherlands is constantly threatened by the sea, which the Dutch have managed to tame through ingenuity and an innovative mindset. Élie Faure thus wrote in his Histoire de l’art (volume published in 1920) about the relationship the Dutch had with their country: "They struggled for ten centuries to seize its mud, to build upon it, to rebuild their cities that collapse into the peat bogs or that a tidal wave drowns in mud and shifting sand. Life was too hard for them, and now it is too good to live for them to seek, outside its daily aspects, the intellectual education it can offer to those who live in the freedom, idleness, and passionate excitements of southern countries, tormented either by the needs of an imagination left to itself or by the torturing will to repress its excesses."

== Central and Late Middle Ages ==
=== Romanesque architecture ===
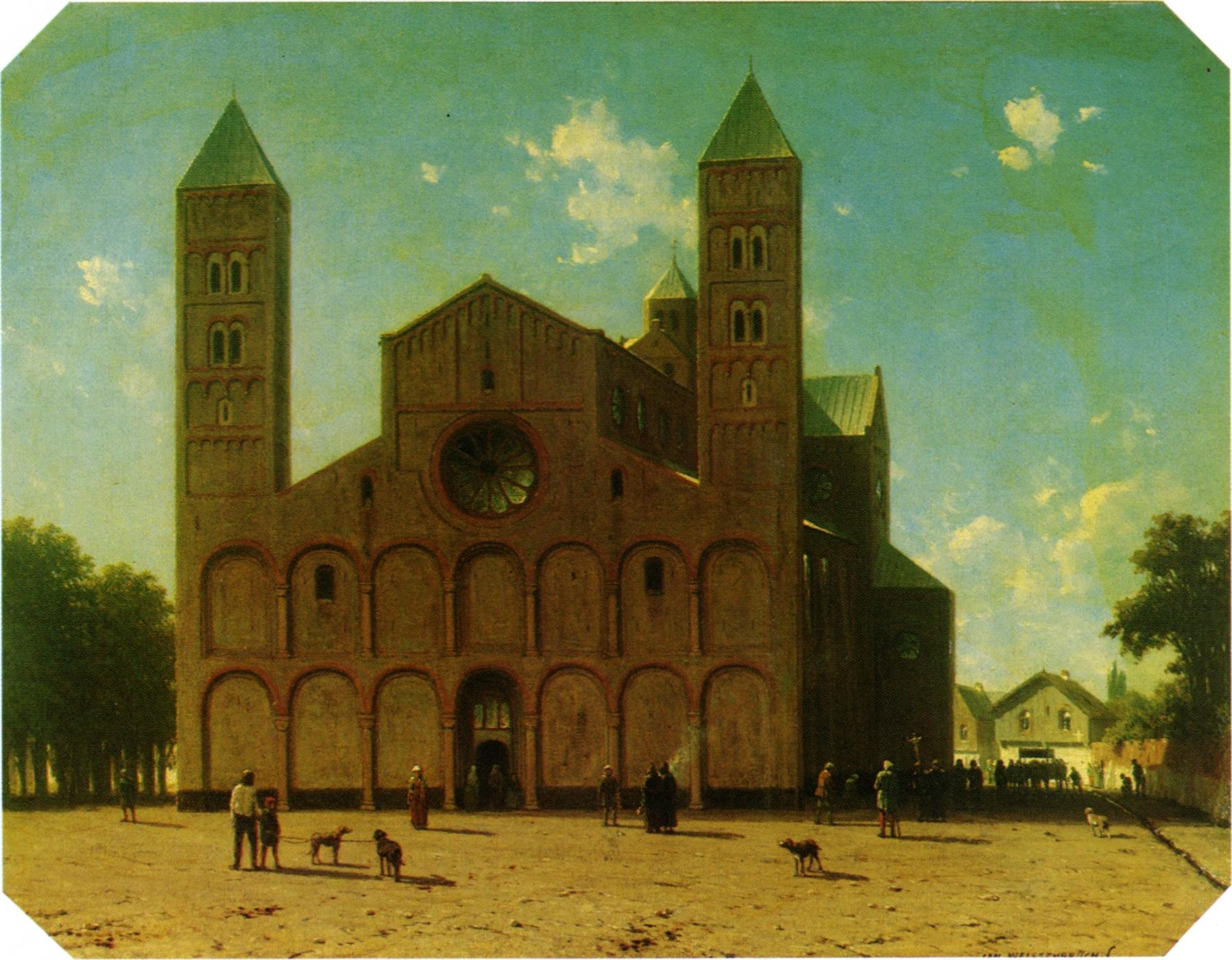
The 11th-century St. Mary's Church in Utrecht.

From written sources, it is certain that stone churches were built as early as the beginning of the 8th century in Maastricht, but these have long since disappeared. However, some examples of Carolingian churches built in the Netherlands still remain, such as the Basilica of Saint Servatius in Maastricht and the "Walkhof" chapel in Nijmegen.

From the Romanesque period onward, the Netherlands were part of an architectural region extending from where the Rhine enters the gorge near Bingen to its mouth in the North Sea — known as the Lower Rhine–Meuse region. This area, now divided among four countries, formed an artistic unity during the Middle Ages. Romanesque architecture covers a period from the mid-10th century to around the end of the 12th century (as Gothic architecture spread more slowly in the northern Netherlands).

In the Dutch territory, one notable remaining Romanesque structure is St. Peter’s Church in Utrecht, which stands as the last well-preserved example of a columned Romanesque basilica in the Lower Rhine–Meuse region. The spaces of this church are lofty, and the columns with square capitals are slender, leaving a strong impression on visitors. There was also a Romanesque church in Utrecht dedicated to Saint Mary, which was particularly significant. Though now gone, this building featured galleries and double-bay vaults with rectangular ribs, showing similarities to Lombard churches. Thus, Dutch architecture in the Middle Ages did not yet exhibit a distinct identity; it was mainly subject to regional influences. The Basilica of Our Lady of the Assumption in Maastricht is an important Romanesque monument under German influence[2]. This influence is reflected in the more developed westworks and the presence of western towers.

== Renaissance and Baroque ==
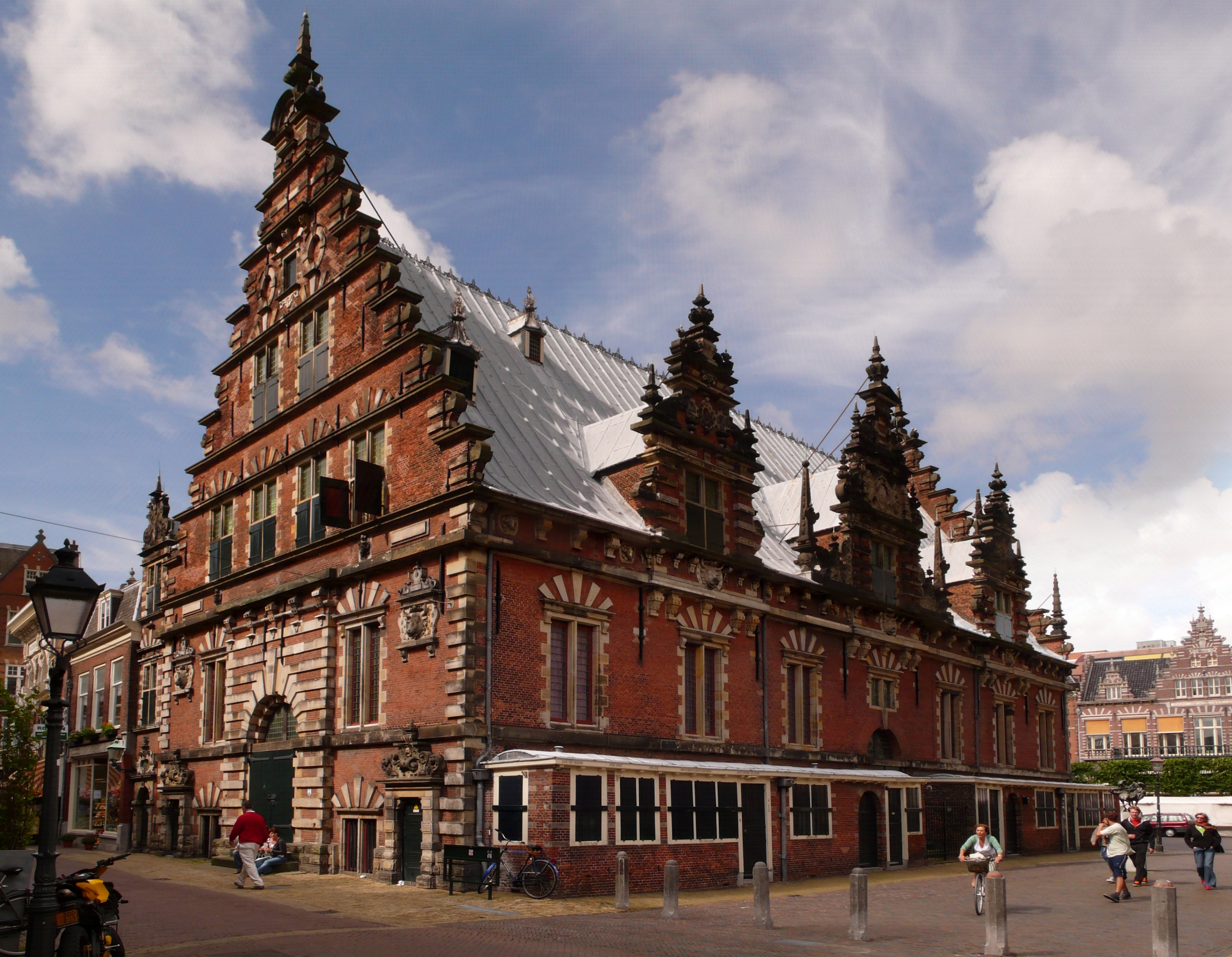
The Vleeshal in Haarlem, dating from 1603

The Dutch Golden Age roughly spanned the 17th century. Due to the thriving economy, cities expanded greatly. New town halls and storehouses were built, and many new canals were dug out in and around various cities such as Delft, Leiden, and Amsterdam for defense and transport purposes. Many wealthy merchants had new houses built along these canals. These houses were generally very narrow and had ornamented façades that befitted their new status. In the countryside, new country houses were built, though not in the same numbers.

Of Italian Renaissance architecture, primarily visual characteristics such as pillars, pilasters, pediments, and rustication were adopted, since many Dutch architects were unable to read the theoretical substantiation, which was often written down in Italian or Latin. Horizontal lines were emphasized, contrasting with the vertical emphasis of Gothic architecture. For instance, light-coloured bands were embedded into facades to emphasize this horizontal character. Another common application in Dutch Renaissance architecture, particularly in Amsterdam, was the stepped gable, which was meant to hide the diagonal lines of the gable behind the straight lines of the façade.

The architecture of the first republic in Northern Europe was marked by sobriety and restraint, and was meant to reflect democratic values by quoting extensively from classical antiquity. It found its impetus in the designs of Hendrick de Keyser, who was instrumental in establishing a Venetian-influenced style into early 17th-century architecture through new buildings like the Noorderkerk ("Northern church", 1620–1623) and Westerkerk ("Western church", 1620–1631) in Amsterdam. In general, architecture in the Low Countries, both in the Counter-Reformation-influenced south and Protestant-dominated north, remained strongly invested in northern Italian Renaissance and Mannerist forms that predated the Roman High Baroque style of Borromini and Bernini. Instead, the more austere form practiced in the Dutch Republic was well suited to major building patterns: palaces for the House of Orange and new civic buildings, uninfluenced by the Counter-Reformation style that made some headway in Antwerp.

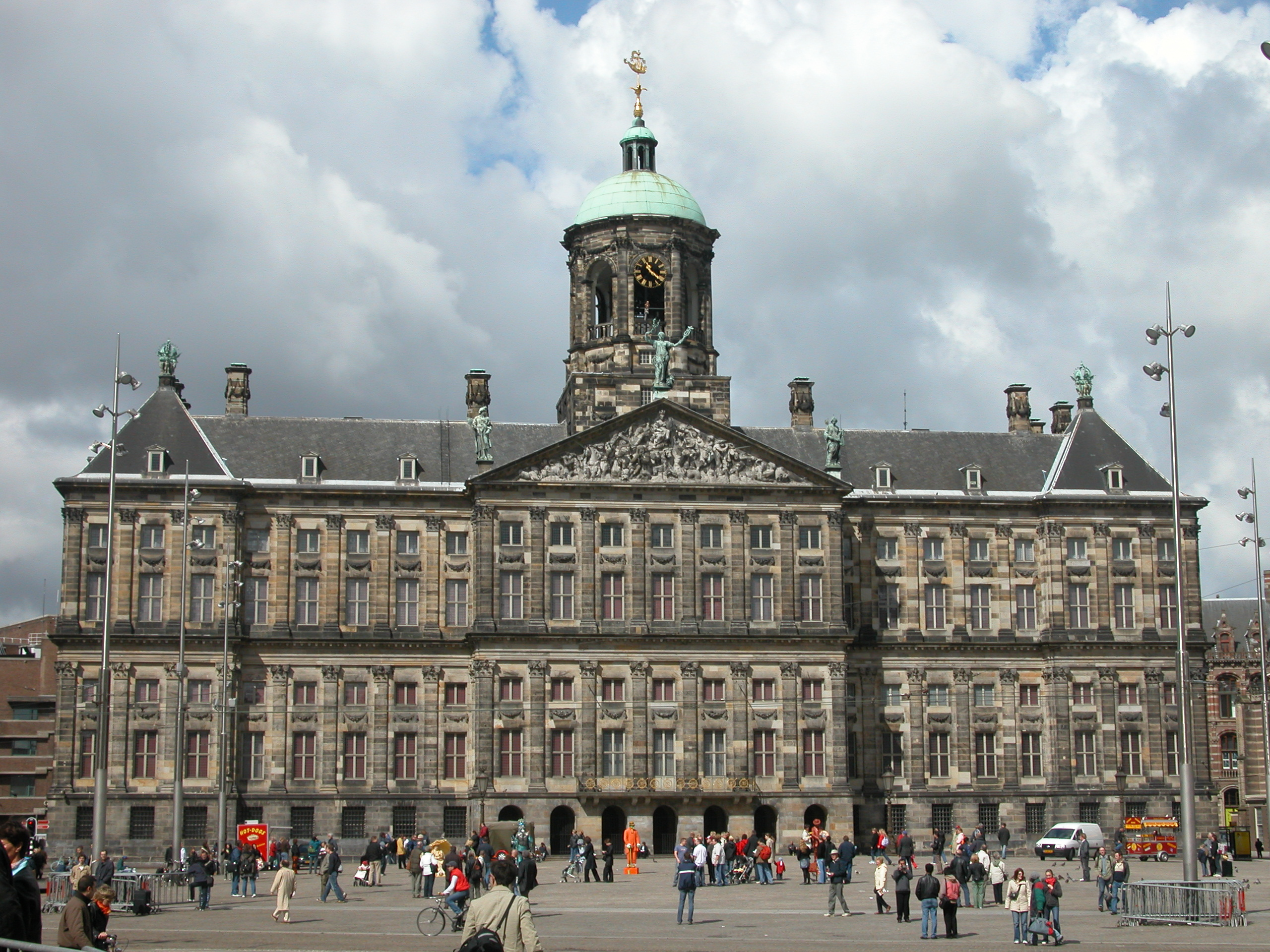
Town Hall of Amsterdam, built in 1665

The major exponents of the mid-17th century, Jacob van Campen and Pieter Post, adopted de Keyser's forms for such eclectic elements as giant-order pilasters, gable roofs, central pediments, and vigorous steeples. Brought together in a coherent combination, these stylistic developments anticipated Wren's Classicism. The most ambitious constructions of the period included the seats of self-government in Amsterdam (1646) and Maastricht (1658), designed by Campen and Post, respectively. On the other hand, the residences of the House of Orange are closer to a typical burgher mansion than to a royal palace. Two of these, Huis ten Bosch and Mauritshuis, are symmetrical blocks with large windows, stripped of ostentatious Baroque flourishes. The same austerely geometrical effect is achieved without great cost or pretentious effects at the stadholder's summer residence of Het Loo.

Another of the designs used by the Dutch was the use of warm colors such as red or dark orange. They also were roughly textured and had tended to be darkened due to the rough texturing. The use of architectural symmetrical balance was part of their habits as well.

== Modernism ==
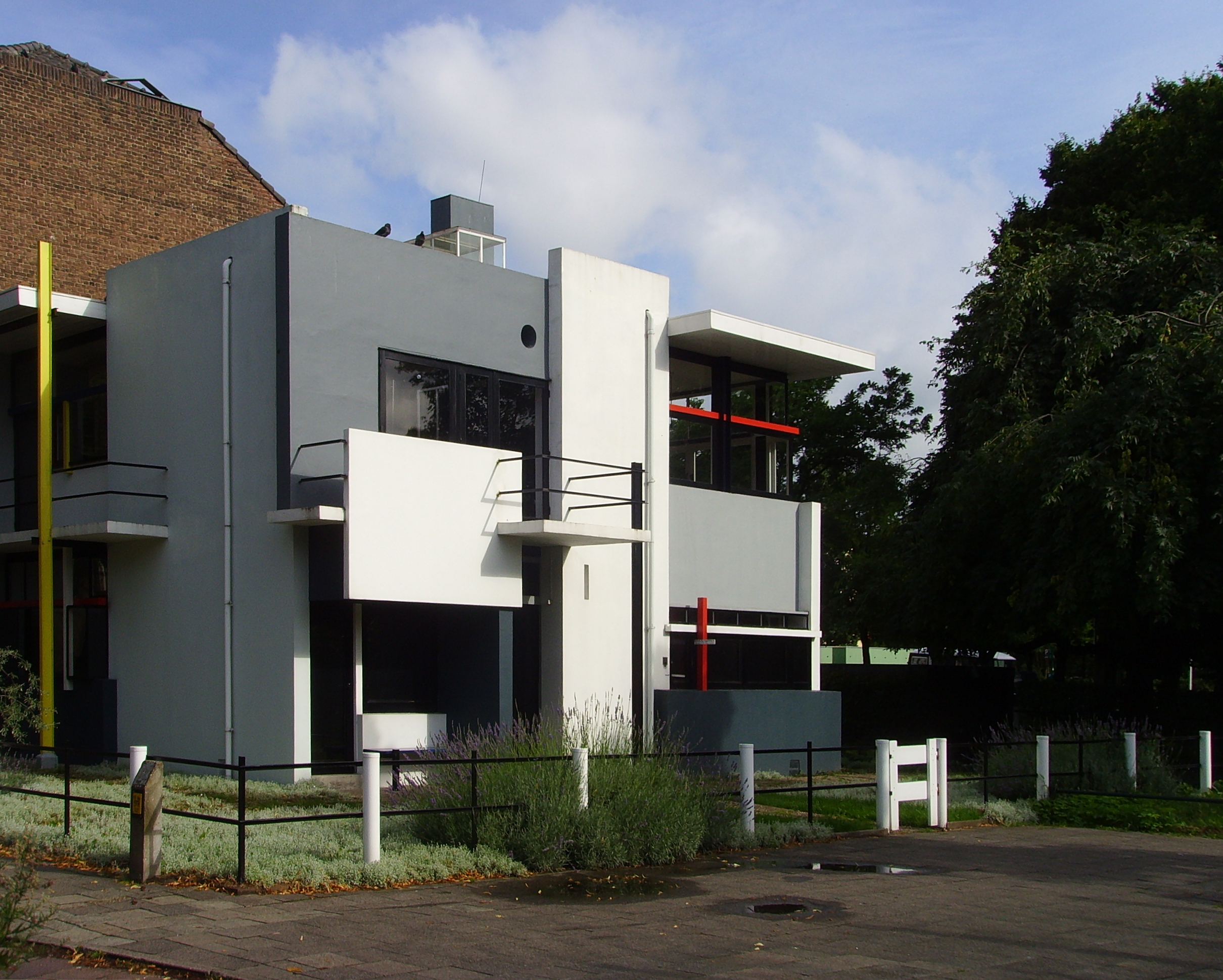
Rietveld Schröder House (1924), designed by Gerrit Rietveld

During the 20th century, Dutch architects like Berlage, Van Doesburg, Van Eesteren, Rietveld, Oud and Van der Vlugt played a leading role in the development of modern architecture in the Netherlands, as well as internationally.

Crucial for the development of modern architecture in the Netherlands has been the work of Hendrik Petrus Berlage, architect of the Beurs van Berlage. He propagated Rationalist architecture, while simultaneously embracing craftsmanship. Berlage has also received critical acclaim for Plan Zuid, an urban plan for Amsterdam-Zuid, which became a model for social housing developments in the Netherlands and abroad. Berlage inspired different movements, and different groups and schools were established accordingly, during the 1910s-1930s, each with their own view on which direction modern architecture should take.

- Expressionist architects like Michel de Klerk and Piet Kramer were associated with the Amsterdam School, a modern movement that emphasized the importance of craftsmanship. A direct relationship can be observed in Plan Zuid.
- Another group established De Stijl, based on the eponymous magazine (1917–1932). Prominents architects of this multidisciplinary artistic movement were J.J.P. Oud, Jan Wils, and Gerrit Rietveld. These architects would later build in a functionalist style.
- A third group, partly developing out of De Stijl, consisted of functionalist architects (Nieuwe Zakelijkheid or Nieuwe Bouwen), such as Mart Stam, Leendert van der Vlugt, and Johannes Duiker. Theye were part of the international modernist group CIAM. Berlage, however, criticized this movement for its lack of emotion. It was nevertheless very influential, also, and especially after WWII, in both architecture and town planning, through the work of, among other, Lotte Stam-Beese and Cornelis van Eesteren. Their work also informed planning theory and practice abroad.
- A more traditionalist current also developed out of Berlage's architecture, especially taking inspiration from its crafsmenship. This developed into the Traditionalist School, which included the Delftse School, headed by Marinus Jan Granpré Molière. Traditionalist architects rejected the main (industrial) principles of functionalism, and came to the fore in the 1930s. As a movement, traditionalist architecture lasted until well after 1945.

Several cross-connections existed between the schools and movements, as can be observed in the work of Willem Dudok; some of his designs have traditionalist features, while others are landmarks of functionalism. In the (late) 1930s, various modern architects advocated a return to (certain) traditional artistic principles, instead of following a machine aesthetics, among them J.J.P Oud and Sybold van Ravesteyn, although the reverse happened as well, especially in the 1950s-1960s (e.g. J.F. Berghoef). The different movements and schools, together with their disputes, would inform the development of Dutch architecture in the second half of the 20th century, which also witnessed the emergence of new (modern) movements, structuralism being an important one, with architects such as Aldo van Eyck, Herman Hertzberger, and Piet Blom.

== Dutch colonial architecture ==
The Dutch colonial empire, established from the 17th century onward, was one of the largest ever formed until its dissolution in the 20th century during decolonization. The Dutch imparted their own architectural style to these colonized territories, with models originating from the metropolis being more or less transformed under the influence of local building traditions. Dutch colonial architecture is found primarily in the Americas, South Africa, and Southeast Asia.

=== Dutch West Indies ===
The West Indies, in Americas, were divided into two regions:

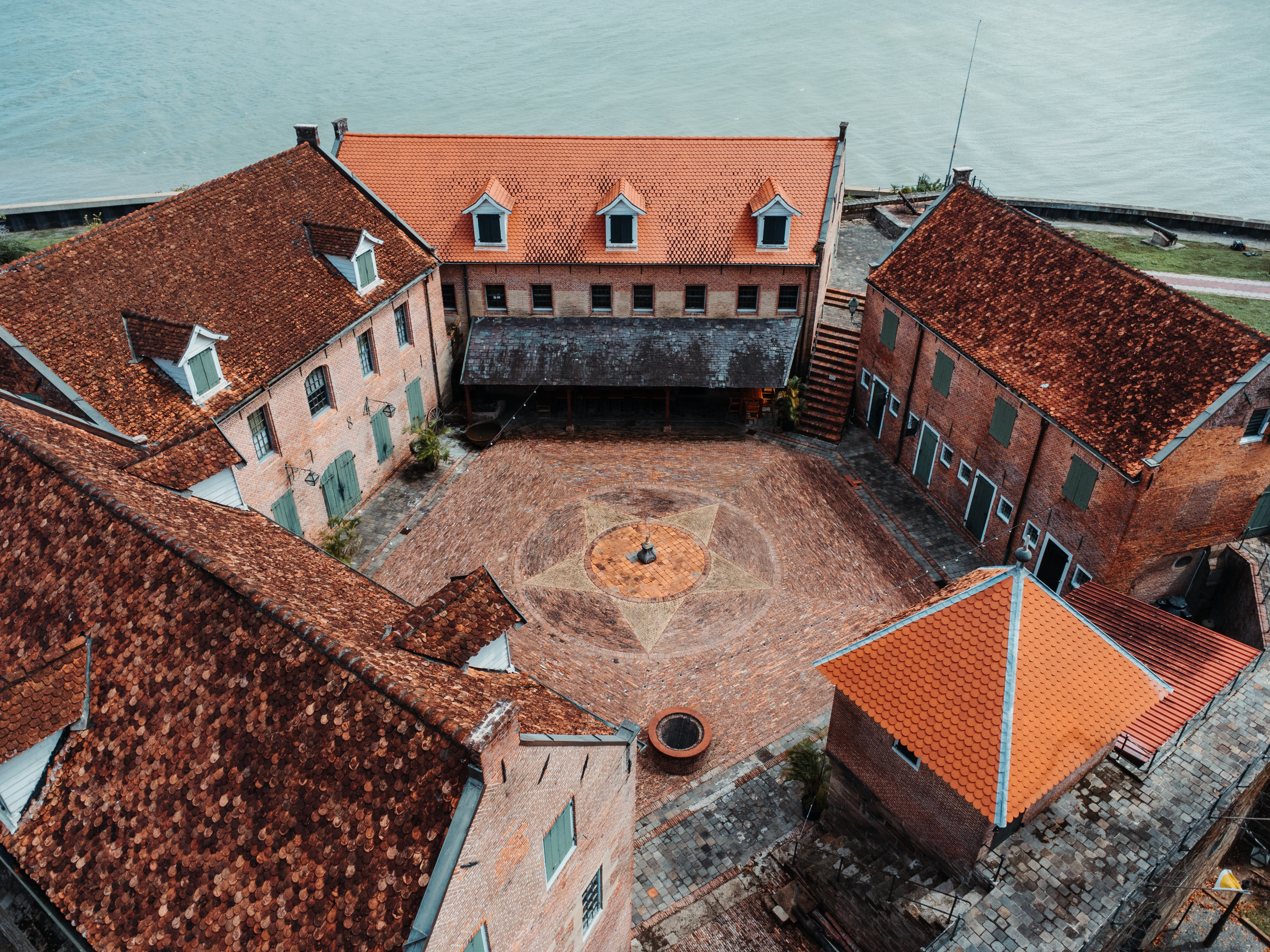
- Fort Zeelandia in Paramaribo, Suriname (formerly Dutch Guiana) was built by the Dutch from the 17th century.
  The Netherlands Antilles consisted of two groups of islands: to the south, the Leeward Islands formed by Curaçao, Bonaire, and Aruba, and to the east, the Windward Islands (or Lesser Antilles), including Sint Eustatius and Saba. The Netherlands also possessed the southern part of the island of Saint Martin (the northern part belonging to France). Since 2010, Curaçao and the Dutch part of the island of Saint Martin have formed two autonomous states within the Kingdom of the Netherlands, similar to the island of Aruba, which has been autonomous since 1986, while the islands of Bonaire, Saba, and Saint Eustatius constitute special municipalities of the Netherlands under the name Caribbean Netherlands. The historic center of Willemstad, the capital of Curaçao, is now a UNESCO World Heritage Site. Most of the listed buildings date from the 18th century, but the oldest district, Punda, dates from the 17th century. The architecture of the buildings constructed in Willemstad is Dutch in style (featuring stepped and scroll gables and decorative details) but adapts to local conditions through the use of brightly painted stucco and the construction of covered galleries.
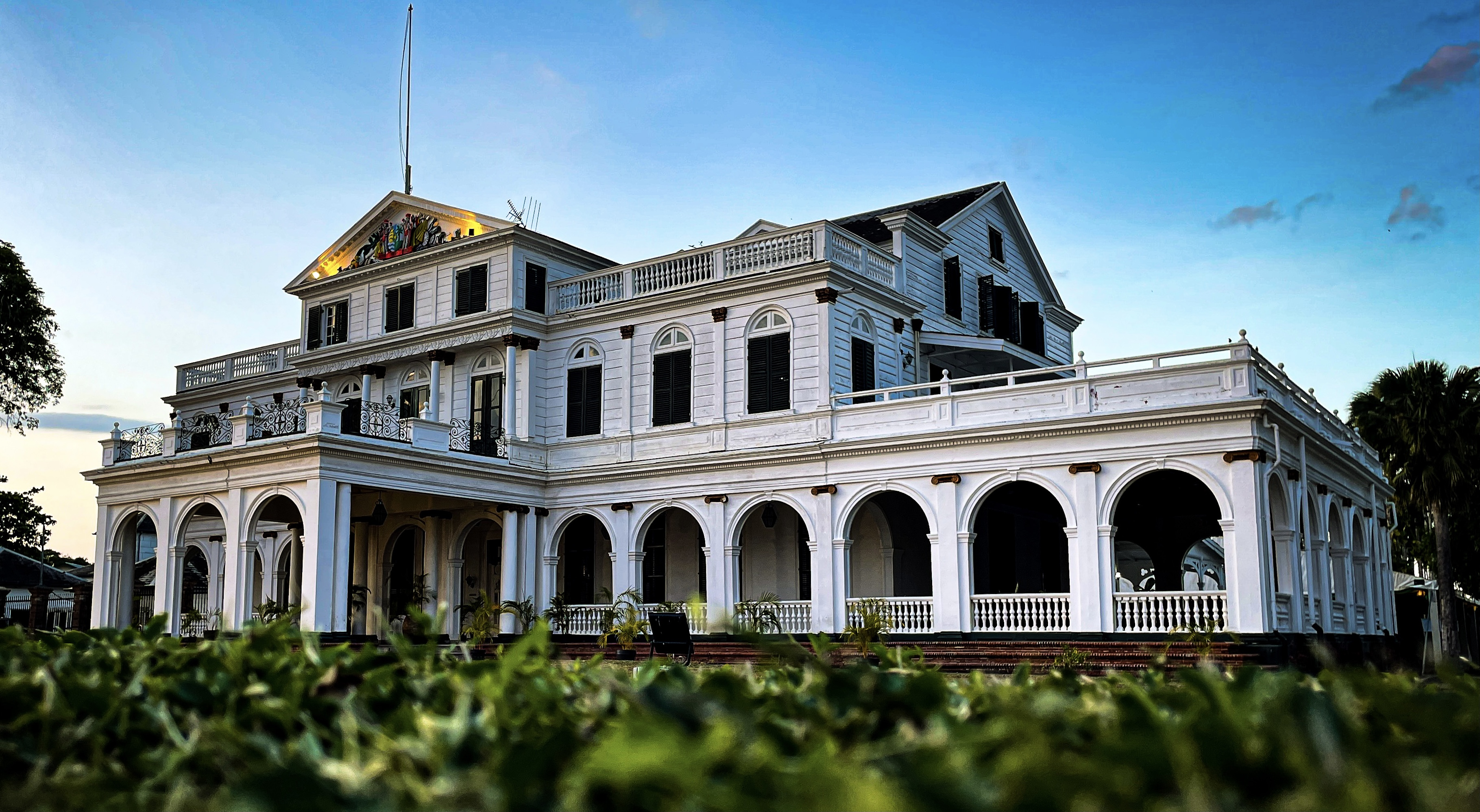
- The Presidential Palace of Suriname, built in 1730 in Paramaribo.
  In Dutch Guiana (present-day Suriname), the capital city Paramaribo has a distinctly Dutch character, although certain local building traditions have also been preserved. Important buildings there were constructed of brick, while houses were traditionally made of wood painted gray. Numerous canals were dug by the Dutch, who also laid out wide sandy avenues throughout the city. Now a UNESCO World Heritage Site, the historic center consists of buildings dating from the 17th and 18th centuries. Drawing on their own experience, the Dutch were able to expand the city over marshy land. Major landmarks include Fort Zeelandia, built beginning in the 17th century; the current Presidential Palace, built of stone and wood and dating from 1730; the brick Ministry of Finance, dating from 1841; the Neoclassical Reformed Church, built in 1837; and the Catholic Church, built of wood in 1885 in the Neo-Gothic style. The territory of New Holland in Brazil belonged to the Dutch from 1630 to 1654, and its capital at the time was Mauritstadt, that is, Recife.

=== Dutch East Indies ===
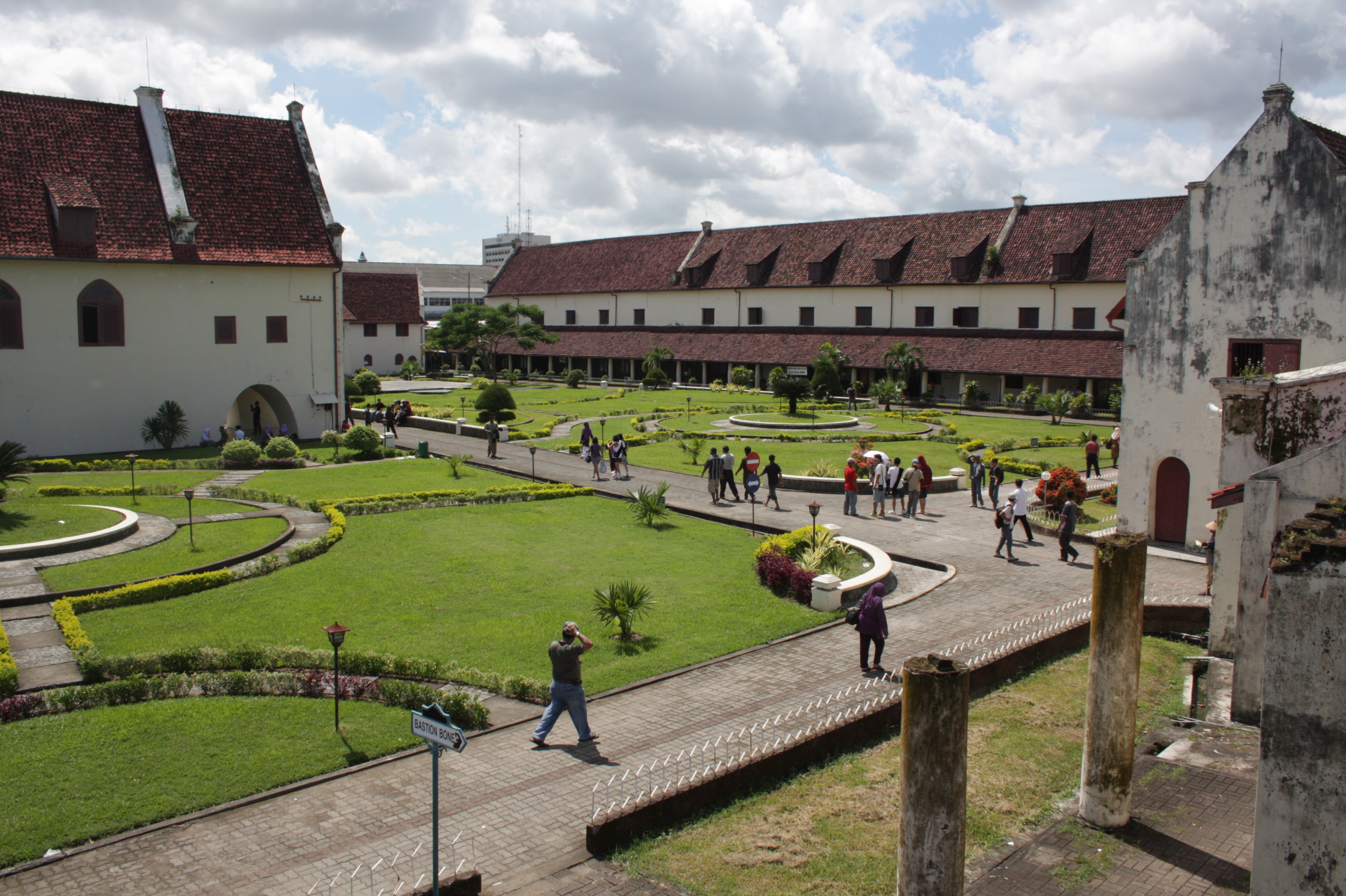
Fort Rotterdam in Makassar, Indonesia, a typical Dutch fort of the 17th century.

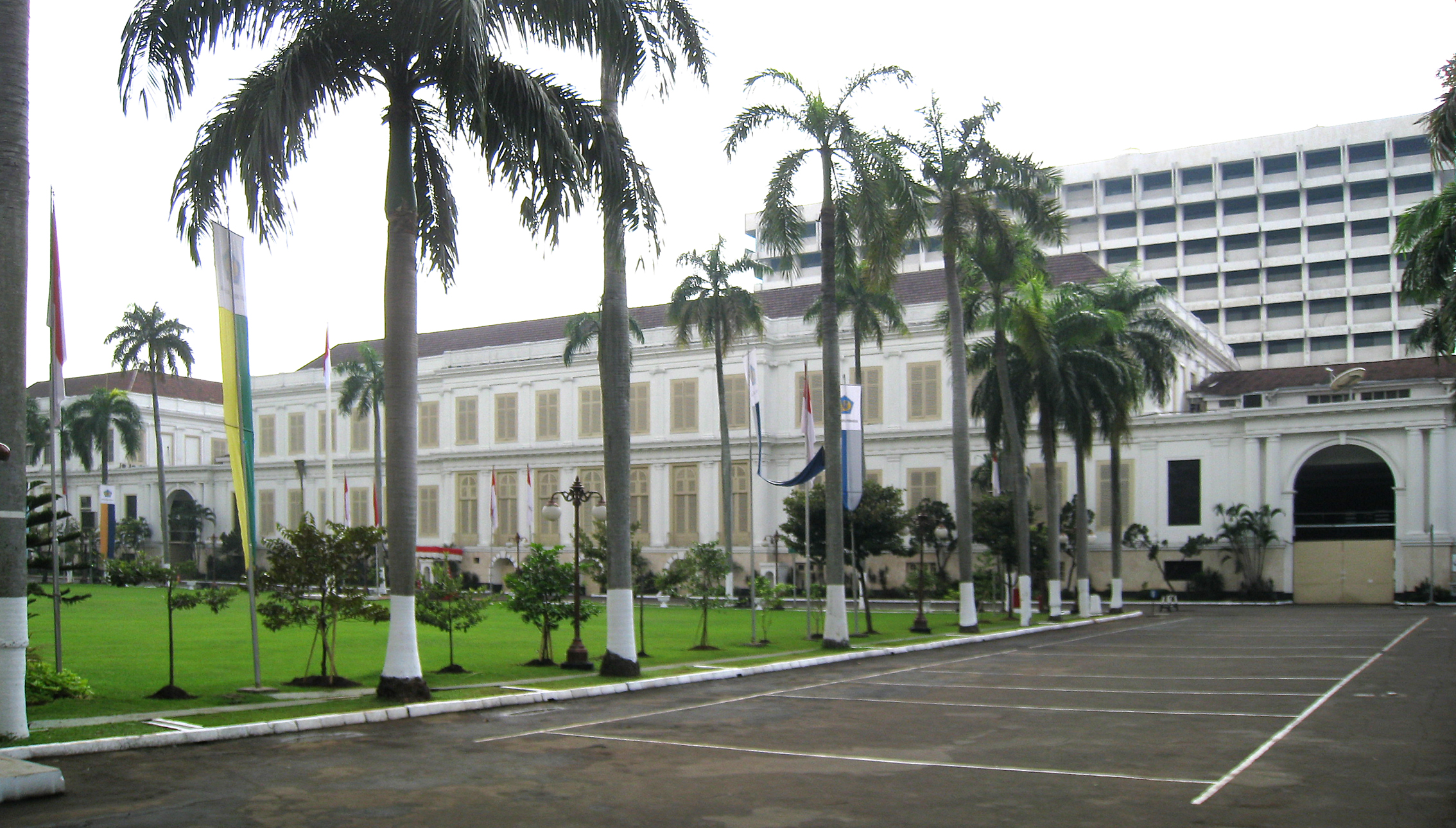
Palace of the Governor-General of the East Indies, built in 1828 by Jannis Tromp in Batavia (now housing the Indonesian Ministry of Finance in Jakarta).

The Dutch East Indies, located in Southeast Asia, covered an area of 18,600,000 km² and included nearly 30 million inhabitants at the beginning of the 20th century. They now form present-day Indonesia. The capital of the Dutch East Indies was Batavia, founded in 1619 following the destruction of the former capital, Jakarta, due to the Javanese uprisings of 1618. Batavia, located on the island of Java, was composed of three parts:

- The lower city (or old Batavia), where the trading posts run by Europeans as well as hotels were located.
- The upper city (Weltevreden), where the residential houses were found—very large and generally consisting of one upper floor. These neighborhoods were spacious and sparsely populated, as each house had extensive gardens.
- The Chinese quarter, close to the commercial districts, situated between the upper and lower cities.

The lower and upper cities were connected at the beginning of the 20th century by steam and electric trams, and canals were dug along the main avenues, lined with houses occupied by colonists. The natives were relegated to peripheral neighborhoods called kampongs. These canals were used for transporting goods and also served as bathing places for the natives.

The most important public buildings constructed by the Dutch were the Governor-General’s Palace, the Batavian Society Museum at Koningsplein (the royal square), the churches, the theater, and the Harmonie and Concordia clubs, which contained reading rooms, concert halls, and lounges.

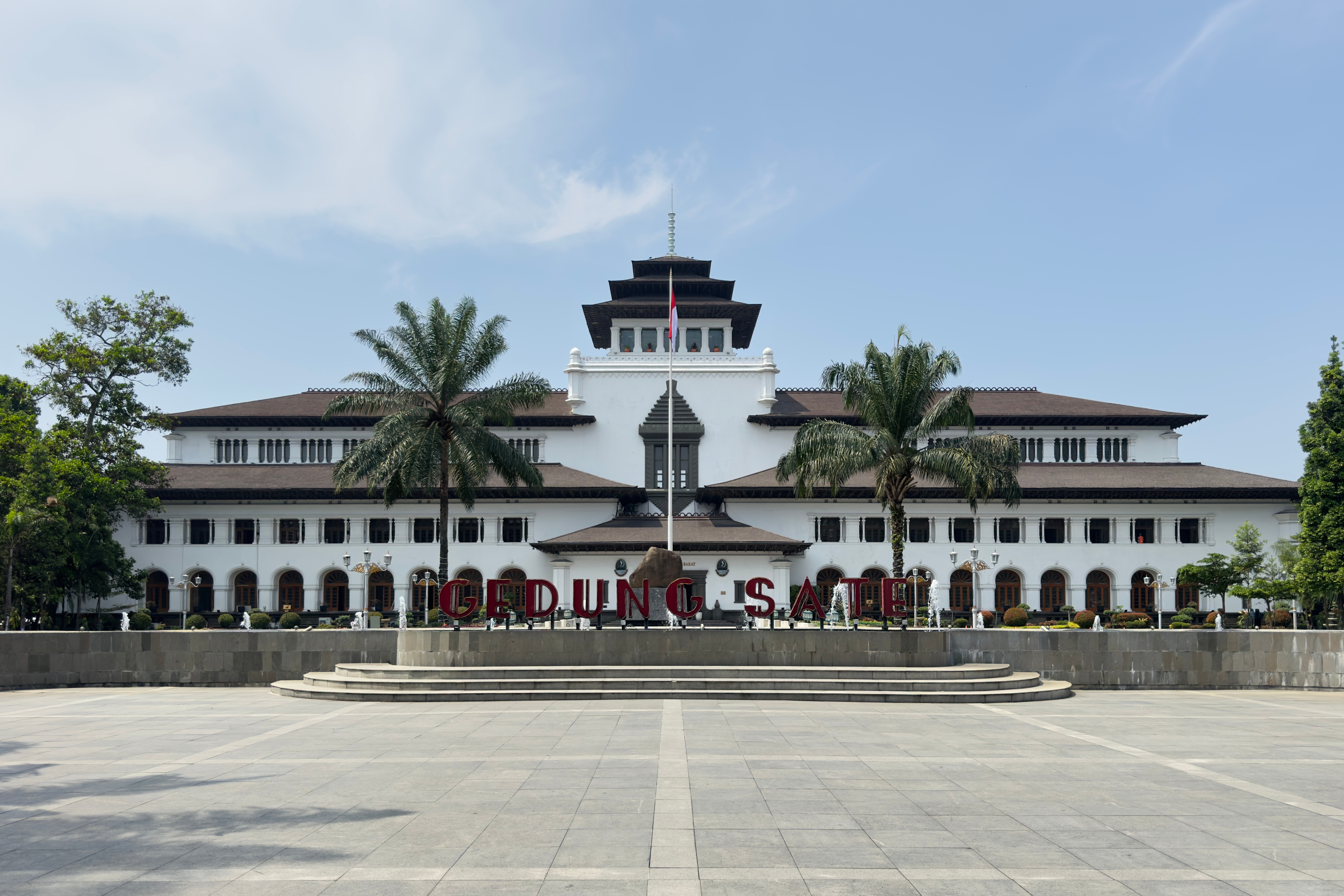
Gedung Sate in Bandung, showing local indigenous form in modernist building.

Surabaya, also located on the island of Java, was at the beginning of the 20th century a large city but less populated than Batavia. In the old town, the Dutch built a commercial complex (composed of a large naval establishment, workshops, and warehouses) bordered by bourgeois houses and social clubs. Around it were built more modest houses in the classical Dutch style. Surabaya also consisted of a lower and an upper city but showed more unity than Batavia. A main street crossed the European, Chinese, Malay, and Arab districts. The outlying neighborhoods were made up of scattered buildings along the main roads but became denser along side streets, where clerks, dockyard workers, and naval employees lived. Finally, in the countryside, large houses were occupied by wealthy European merchants.

Surakarta, also on Java, included a European quarter where stood the Residence Palace, the Protestant church, a theater, a mosque, the Imperial Guard barracks, and a teacher training college. In the center of the city stood Fort Vastenburg, surrounded by a wide moat.

== See also ==
- Cape Dutch architecture
- Colonial architecture of Indonesia
- Dutch colonial architecture
- List of protected buildings in Sint Eustatius
