= Eckhaus =

Eckhaus may refer to:

- Eckhaus equation, a mathematical equation introduced by Wiktor Eckhaus
- Eckhaus Latta, an American fashion brand co-founded by Mike Eckhaus

== People with the surname ==
- Wiktor Eckhaus (1930–2000), Polish–Dutch mathematician
- Zevi Eckhaus, American football quarterback

== See also ==
- James Eckhouse, American actor
