= Kundu equation =

General form of integrable system

The Kundu equation is a general form of integrable system that is gauge-equivalent to the mixed nonlinear Schrödinger equation. It was proposed by Anjan Kundu as

$$i q_t + q_{xx} + i\alpha (| q|^2q)_x + c |q|^2q -(\theta_t+ \theta_x^2-i\theta_{xx} )q + \theta_x( 2iq_x - \alpha | q|^2 q)=0,$$	1

with arbitrary function $\theta (t,x)$ and the subscripts denoting partial derivatives. Equation (1) is shown to be reducible for the choice of $\theta_{x} = -\kappa |q|^2$ to an integrable class of mixed nonlinear Schrödinger equation with cubic–quintic nonlinearity, given in a representative form

$$q_t + q_{xx} + i\alpha (| q|^2q)_x + c |q|^2q + \gamma |q|^4q + 4i \kappa (| q|^2)_x q = 0 .$$	2

Here $\alpha, c, \kappa$ are independent parameters, while $\gamma = \kappa(4 \kappa + \alpha) .$ Equation (1), more specifically equation (2) is known as the Kundu equation.

== Properties and applications ==
The Kundu equation is a completely integrable system, allowing Lax pair representation, exact solutions, and higher conserved quantity. Along with its different particular cases, this equation has been investigated for finding its exact travelling wave solutions, exact solitary wave solutions via bilinearization, and Darboux transformation together with the orbital stability for such solitary wave solutions.

The Kundu equation has been applied to various physical processes such as fluid dynamics, plasma physics, and nonlinear optics. It is linked to the mixed nonlinear Schrödinger equation through a gauge transformation and is reducible to a variety of known integrable equations such as the nonlinear Schrödinger equation (NLSE), derivative NLSE, higher nonlinear derivative NLSE, Chen–Lee–Liu, Gerjikov-Vanov, and Kundu–Eckhaus equations, for different choices of the parameters.

== Kundu-Eckhaus equation ==
A generalization of the nonlinear Schrödinger equation with additional quintic nonlinearity and a nonlinear dispersive term was proposed in the form

$$\psi_t+\psi_{xx} -2 c |\psi|^2\psi+\kappa^2|\psi|^4\psi \pm 2i \kappa (| \psi|^2)_x \psi=0,$$	3

which may be obtained from the Kundu Equation (2), when restricted to $\alpha =0$. The same equation, limited further to the particular case $c =0,$ was introduced later as the Eckhaus equation, following which equation (3) is presently known as the Kundu-Ekchaus equation. The Kundu-Ekchaus equation can be reduced to the nonlinear Schrödinger equation through a nonlinear transformation of the field and known therefore to be gauge equivalent integrable systems, since they are equivalent under the gauge transformation.

=== Properties and Applications ===
The Kundu-Ekchaus equation is associated with a Lax pair, higher conserved quantity, exact soliton solution, rogue wave solution etc. Over the years various aspects of this equation, its generalizations and link with other equations have been studied. In particular, relationship of Kundu-Ekchaus equation with the Johnson's hydrodynamic equation near criticality is established, its discretizations, reduction via Lie symmetry, complex structure via Bernoulli subequation, bright and dark soliton solutions via Bäcklund transformation and Darboux transformation with the associated rogue wave solutions, are studied.

=== RKL equation ===
A multi-component generalisation of the Kundu-Ekchaus equation (3), known as Radhakrishnan, Kundu and Laskshmanan (RKL) equation was proposed in nonlinear optics for fiber optics communication through soliton pulses in a birefringent non-Kerr medium and analysed subsequently for its exact soliton solution and other aspects in a series of papers.

=== Quantum Aspects ===
Though the Kundu-Ekchaus equation (3) is gauge equivalent to the nonlinear Schrödinger equation, they differ with respect to their Hamiltonian structures and field commutation relations. The Hamiltonian operator of the Kundu-Ekchaus equation quantum field model given by

$${H}
=\int dx \left[ : \left( (\psi^\dagger_x \psi_x + c \rho^2
+i \kappa \rho (\psi^\dagger \psi_x- \psi^\dagger_x \psi) \right):
+\kappa^2
(\psi^\dagger \rho ^2 \psi) \right], \ \ \ \ \rho \equiv (\psi^\dagger \psi)$$

and defined through the bosonic field operator commutation relation $[\psi (x), \psi^\dagger(y)]= \delta(x-y)$, is more complicated than the well-known bosonic Hamiltonian of the quantum nonlinear Schrödinger equation. Here $\ : \ \ : \$ indicates normal ordering in bosonic operators. This model corresponds to a double $\delta$-function interacting Bose gas and is difficult to solve directly.

=== One-dimensional Anion gas ===
However, under a nonlinear transformation of the field below:

$$\tilde \psi (x)= e^{-i \kappa \int^x_{- \infty}
\psi^\dagger (x') \psi (x') dx'} \psi (x)$$

the model can be transformed to:

$$\tilde H=\int dx \vdots \left(
\tilde \psi^\dagger_x \tilde \psi_x
+ c (\tilde \psi^\dagger \tilde \psi)^2 \right) \vdots
,$$

i.e. in the same form as the quantum model of the Nonlinear Schrödinger equation (NLSE), though it differs from the NLSE in its contents, since now the fields involved are no longer bosonic operators but exhibit anion like properties.

$$\tilde \psi^\dagger (x_1) \tilde \psi^\dagger (x_2)=e^{i \kappa\epsilon (x_1-x_2)}
\tilde \psi^\dagger (x_2)\tilde \psi^\dagger (x_1) ,
\ \tilde \psi (x_1) \tilde \psi^\dagger (x_2)=e^{-i \kappa \epsilon (x_1-x_2)}
\tilde \psi^\dagger (x_2)\tilde \psi (x_1)+ \delta (x_1-x_2)$$

etc. where

$\epsilon (x-y)= + \ , -, 0 \ \ ~$ for $\ ~ x >y, \ x< y, \ \ x = y ,$

though at the coinciding points the bosonic commutation relation still holds. In analogy with the Lieb Limiger model of $\delta$ function bose gas, the quantum Kundu-Ekchaus model in the N-particle sector therefore corresponds to a one-dimensional (1D) anion gas interacting via a $\delta$ function interaction. This model of interacting anion gas was proposed and exactly solved by the Bethe ansatz in and this basic anion model is studied further for investigating various aspects of the 1D anion gas as well as extended in different directions.
