= Traditionalist School (architecture) =

Architectural movement

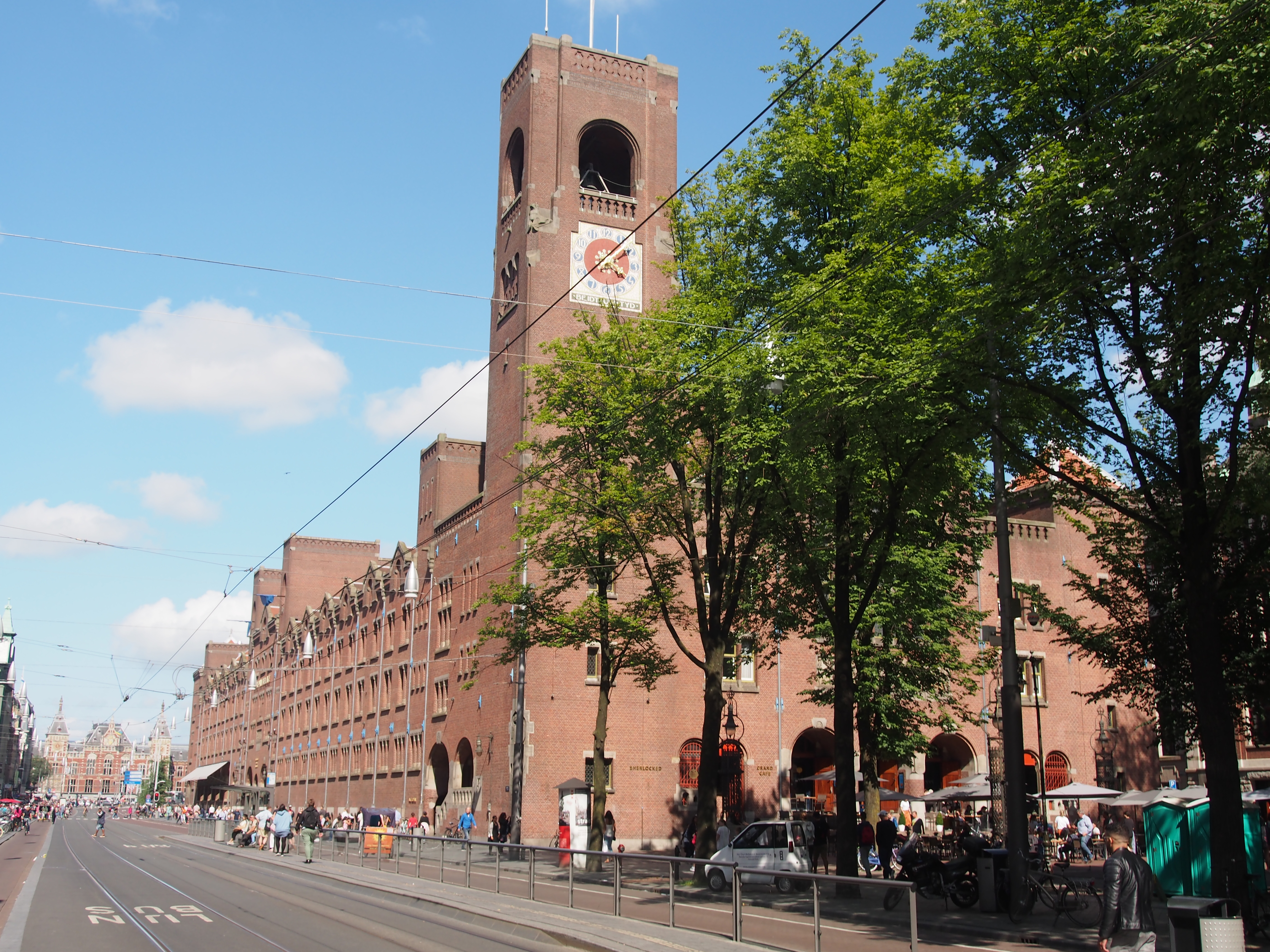
Beurs van Berlage in Amsterdam, 1903 (Hendrik Petrus Berlage) rationalism was an important precursor of Dutch traditionalism

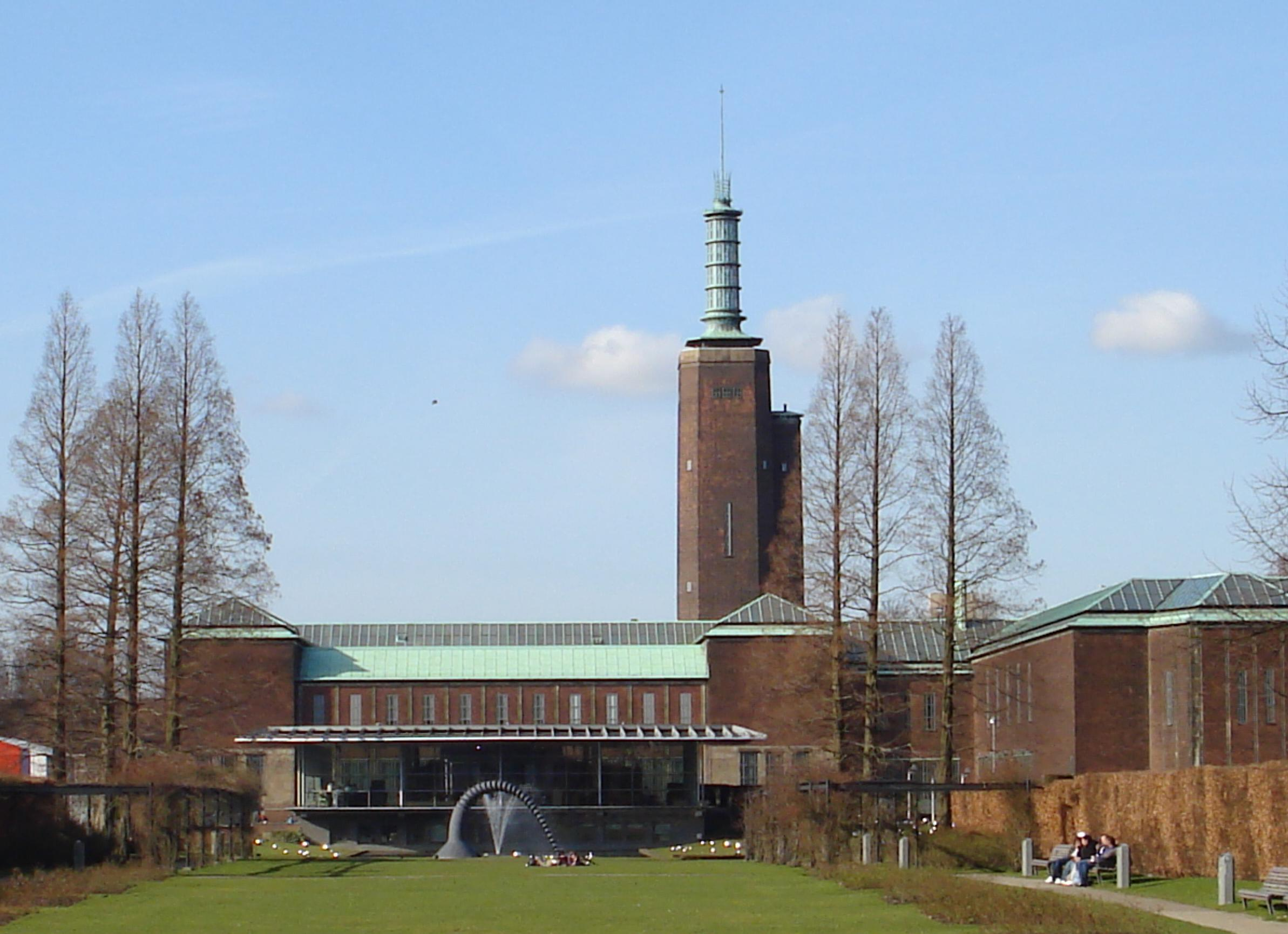
Museum Boijmans Van Beuningen in Rotterdam, 1935 (Ad van der Steur)

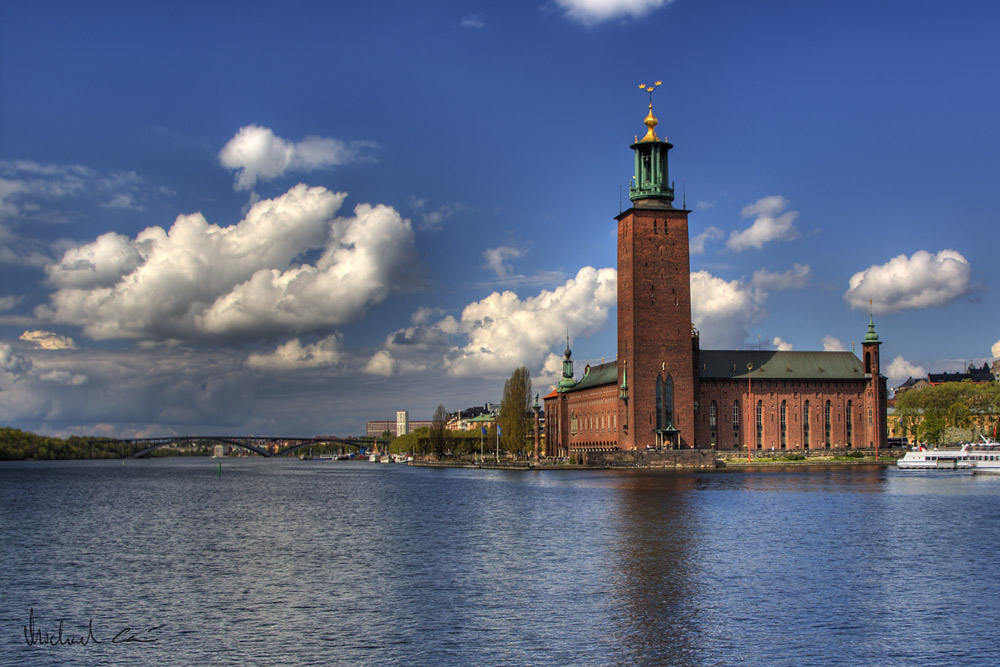
Stockholm City Hall, 1923 (Ragnar Östberg)

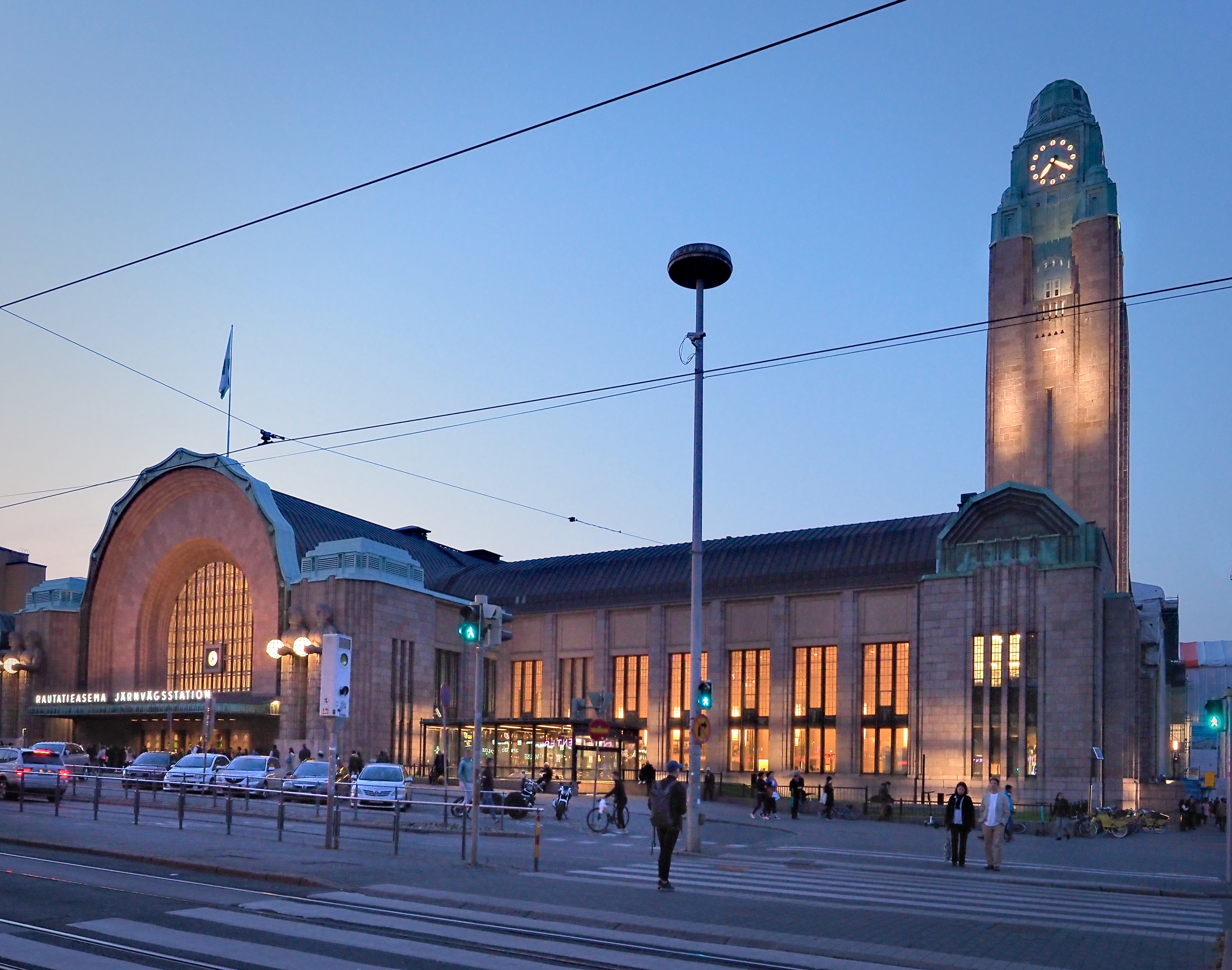
Helsinki Central Station, 1919 (Eliel Saarinen)

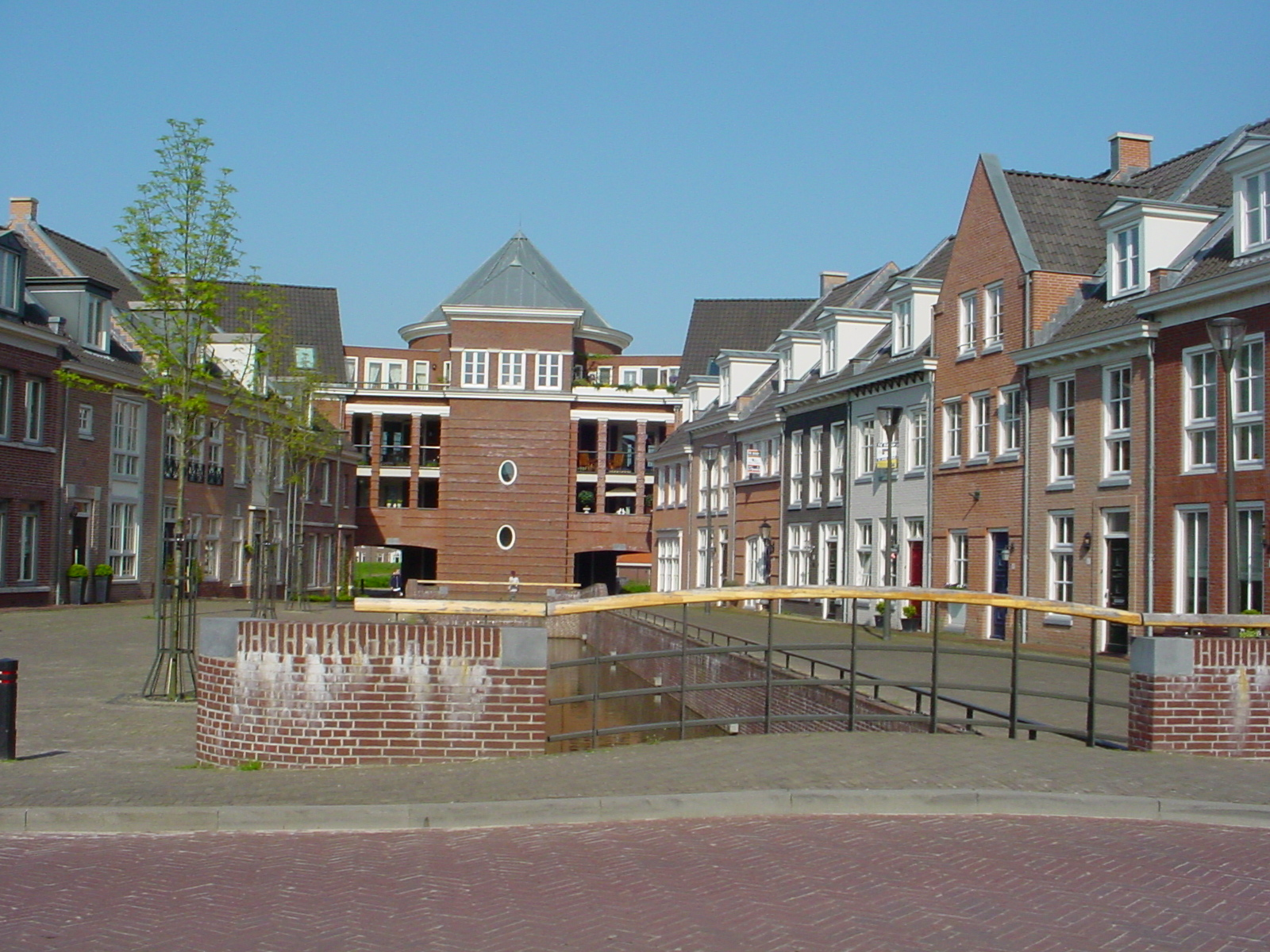
Brandevoort housing estate in Helmond, 2005 (Rob Krier)

Traditionalist architecture is an architectural movement in Europe since the beginning of the 20th century in the Netherlands, Scandinavia, Germany et al. In the Netherlands Traditionalism was a reaction to the Neo Gothic and Neo-Renaissance styles by Pierre Cuypers (Rijksmuseum Amsterdam 1885, Centraal Station Amsterdam 1889). One of the first influential buildings of Traditionalism was the Beurs van Berlage in Amsterdam, finished in 1903. Since the 1920s Traditionalist architecture has been a parallel movement to Modern architecture (Cubist, Constructivist and Expressionist architecture).

In Dutch architecture, the Traditionalist School was also a reaction against Functionalism as well as the Expressionism of the Amsterdam School, and meant a revival of rural and national architectural styles and traditions, with tidy, visible brickwork, minimal decoration and "honest" (that is, traditional and natural) materials.

It occurred after the First World War and at its center was, as it was called after 1945, the Delft School, led by Marinus Jan Granpré Molière, professor at the Technical University in Delft from 1924 until 1953. Traditionalism can be seen in many ways as a direct successor to Berlage-type Rationalism.

It was highly influential on church design up after 1945, especially in Catholic architecture but gaining influence as well on Protestant architecture just before World War Two, especially on architects like Berend Tobia Boeyinga and Egbert Reitsma. During the reconstruction after the war, its influence on secular architecture reached a peak while its importance for church architecture slowly vanished.

== Delft School Members ==
- Marinus Jan Granpré Molière
- Cornelis Hubertus (Cees) de Bever
- Gijsbert Friedhoff
- Bernardus Joannes Koldewey
- Kees van Moorsel

== Others ==
- Alexander Kropholler
- Alphons Boosten
- Frits Peutz
- Hendrik Willem Valk

== Sources ==
- Archimon
