= James Eckhouse =

American actor

- Born: James Hays Eckhouse; February 14, 1955 (age 71); Chicago, Illinois, U.S.
- Education: Juilliard School (BFA)
- Occupations: Actor, director
- Years active: 1982–present
- Spouse: Sheila Keliher Walsh (m. 1982)
- Children: 2

James Hays Eckhouse (born February 14, 1955) is an American actor, best known for playing Jim Walsh on Beverly Hills, 90210. He also directed three episodes of the show.

== Career ==
Before his part on Beverly Hills, 90210, Eckhouse had small roles in such films as Trading Places, Fatal Attraction, Big and Cocktail. He was a series regular on Beverly Hills, 90210 from the pilot episode in 1990 until the end of the fifth season in 1995. He also co-starred in 1999's Judgement Day.

== Personal life ==
Eckhouse studied briefly at MIT before beginning his acting career. He and his wife have two sons.

== Filmography ==
=== Film ===
| Year | Title | Role | Notes |
|---|---|---|---|
| 1983 | Trading Places | Guard | |
| 1985 | Blue Heaven | Tony Sabella | |
| 1985 | When Nature Calls | Bobby | |
| 1987 | 84 Charing Cross Road | Joey, The Dentist | |
| 1987 | Fatal Attraction | Man in Japanese Restaurant | |
| 1988 | Shakedown | Steve Rosen | |
| 1988 | Big | Supervisor | |
| 1988 | Cocktail | Tourist | |
| 1989 | Fat Man and Little Boy | Robert Harper | |
| 1991 | Defending Your Life | Jeep Owner | |
| 1992 | Leaving Normal | Rich | |
| 1994 | Junior | Ned Sneller | |
| 1998 | One True Thing | District Attorney | |
| 1999 | The Learning Curve | Mr. Stevens | |
| 2000 | Joseph: King of Dreams | Potiphar (voice) | Direct to video |
| 2002 | Malevolent | Dorland, Polygraph Technician | Uncredited |
| 2002 | Cathedral | Ed | |
| 2004 | The Sure Hand of God | Benny Ballard | |
| 2004 | A Cinderella Story | Mr. Farrell | |
| 2005 | Guess Who | Workman #1 | |
| 2006 | Jimmy and Judy | Jimmy's Dad | |
| 2008 | Half-Life | Richard Parker | |
| 2008 | Extreme Movie | Jessica's Dad | |
| 2009 | Wake | Mr. Williams | |
| 2009 | Love at First Hiccup | Christian | |
| 2012 | The Avengers | Senator Boynton | |
| 2013 | Shotgun Wedding | Philip 'Flip' Milton | |
| 2016 | The Boy on the Train | Roger | |
| 2016 | Dead Awake | Mr. Bowman | |
| 2017 | Alexander IRL | Arthur | |
| 2018 | Dear Chickens | Doctor Friedman | Short film |
| 2018 | A Simple Wedding | Steven Talbot | |
| 2021 | Saving Paradise | Cameron Wannemaker | |

=== Television ===
| Year | Title | Role | Notes |
|---|---|---|---|
| 1982 | Another World | Costume Clerk | Episode dated: 30 July 1982 |
| 1983 | Will There Really Be a Morning? | Harold Clurman | Television film |
| 1985-1988 | Spenser: For Hire | Lieutenant Commander Carl Westmore / Robert Jordan | 2 episodes |
| 1986 | American Playhouse | Steven | 2 episodes |
| 1986 | The Equalizer | Steve | Episode: "Dead Drop" |
| 1987 | The Equalizer | District Attorney | Episode: "Suspicion of Innocence" |
| 1987-1989 | CBS Summer Playhouse | David / Max Galpin | |
| 1988 | Annie McGuire | Charlie | Episode: "The Hold-Up" |
| 1988 | The Christmas Wife | Jim Tanner | Television film |
| 1989 | Thirtysomething | Jerry Kravitz | Episode: "Politics" |
| 1989 | Matlock | Brian Davis | Episode: "The Con Man" |
| 1990 | Equal Justice | Defense Attorney | Episode: "Goodbye, Judge Green" |
| 1990 | In the Best Interest of the Child | Chilton | Television film |
| 1990 | Sisters | Mark | Television film |
| 1990 | WIOU | Bob Lorwin | Episode: "Pilot" |
| 1990–1998 | Beverly Hills, 90210 | Jim Walsh / Dr. Edwards | Main role; seasons 1–5, guest; seasons 6–8 |
| 1993 | Moment of Truth: Why My Daughter? | Sergeant Jack Powell | Television film |
| 1994 | Burke's Law | Eric Reade | Episode: "Who Killed the Fashion King?" |
| 1995 | Spring Fling! | George | Television film |
| 1995 | The Marshal | Al Kelly | Episode: "Time Off for Clever Behavior" |
| 1996 | Terminal | Dr. Maxwell | Television film |
| 1996 | Intimate Betrayal | Paul | Television film |
| 1996-1998 | Chicago Hope | Jerry Kleiman / Peter Morissey | 2 episodes |
| 1997 | Dharma & Greg | Andy | Episode: "Mr. Montgomery Goes to Washington" |
| 1999 | Judgment Day | Colonel Tom Keller | Television film |
| 1999 | Nash Bridges | Mark Hicks | Episode: "Girl Trouble" |
| 1999 | Family Law | Richard Hershey | Episode: "Holt vs. Holt" |
| 1999 | Snoops | Michael Zindler | Episode: "The Grinch" |
| 1999 | Jingle Bells | Dad | Television film |
| 1999–2000 | Once and Again | Lloyd Lloyd | 4 episodes |
| 2000 | Batman Beyond | Zacharias | Episode: "Speak No Evil" |
| 2001 | Ally McBeal | Attorney | Episode: "Hats Off to Larry" |
| 2001 | Touched by an Angel | Dr. Brad Renslow | Episode: "The Face of God" |
| 2001 | Strong Medicine | Rabbi Yaverbaum | Episode: "Zol Zein Gezint" |
| 2001-2009 | CSI: Crime Scene Investigation | Paul Trent / Hank Marlowe | 2 episodes |
| 2002 | Any Day Now | Mr. Greenburg | Episode: "Truth Hurts" |
| 2002 | The West Wing | Representative Bud Wachtell, Democrat | Episode: "The U.S. Poet Laureate" |
| 2002 | The Agency | Deputy Chief of White House Security Group | Episode: "Air Lex" |
| 2002 | Robbery Homicide Division | Frank Van Pelt | Episode: "2028" |
| 2003 | Hack | Anthony Lewis Sparks | Episode: "A Dangerous Game" |
| 2003 | The Lyon's Den | Leonard Weaver | Episode: "Ex" |
| 2003 | Judging Amy | Attorney Waters | Episode: "Sex and the Single Mother" |
| 2004 | The Practice | Attorney Anthony Selig | Episode: "Avenging Angels" |
| 2004 | The District | Congressman Grant Kingsley | Episode: "Party Favors" |
| 2004 | Without a Trace | Charles Huffman | Episode: "Risen" |
| 2004 | Jack & Bobby | Richard Kramer | Episode: "Lost Boys" |
| 2004-2007 | Las Vegas | Cy Lipshitz / Tolliver | 2 episodes |
| 2005 | Boston Legal | Dr. Adam Carter | Episode: "The Black Widow" |
| 2005 | Close to Home | Matt Doretzky | Episode: "Suburban Prostitution" |
| 2006 | Medium | Dr. Gromada | Episode: "Doctor's Orders" |
| 2006 | Crossing Jordan | Mr. Cartland | Episode: "The Elephant in the Room" |
| 2006 | Commander in Chief | Paul Vitagliano | Episode: "Ties that Bind" |
| 2006 | Jericho | Scott Rennie | Episode: "Four Horsemen" |
| 2006 | Nip/Tuck | Dr. Schwartz | Episode: "Willy Ward" |
| 2008 | Criminal Minds | Mr. Corbett | Episode: "Tabula Rasa" |
| 2010 | Southland | Doctor | Episode: "Butch & Sundance" |
| 2010 | In Plain Sight | Josh Becker | Episode: "WitSec Stepmother" |
| 2011 | Love's Everlasting Courage | Mr. Harris | Television film |
| 2011 | Harry's Law | Leland Parks | Episode: "In the Ghetto" |
| 2011 | The Good Wife | Walter Kermani | 2 episodes |
| 2012 | CSI: Miami | Dan Toring | Episode: "Last Straw" |
| 2013 | Second Chances | Dr. Coleman | Television film |
| 2013 | FutureStates | Will | Episode: "Return to Elektra Springs" |
| 2013 | The Good Mother | Dr. Cullen | Television film |
| 2013 | Days of Our Lives | Judge Sims / The Judge | 10 episodes |
| 2013 | Masters of Sex | Dr. Chuck Ingram | 2 episodes |
| 2013 | Paulie | Eric | Television film |
| 2014 | The Michaels | Judge Stamford | Television film |
| 2014 | NCIS: New Orleans | Dr. Michael Hufcutt | Episode: "Carrier" |
| 2015 | Castle | Gene Vogel | Episode: "Dead from New York" |
| 2015 | Major Crimes | George Clark | Episode: "Hostage of Fortune" |
| 2016 | American Experience | Doctor Willard Bliss | Episode: "Murder of a President" |
| 2016 | The Engagement Clause | Mark Tate | Television film |
| 2017 | High & Mighty | Knotts | 7 episodes |
| 2018 | NCIS | Fred Cabrisio | Episode: "Sight Unseen" |
| 2018 | Station 19 | Pete Sorenson | Episode: "Not Your Hero" |
| 2018 | Code Black | Mr. Berlinger | Episode: "As Night Comes and I'm Breathing" |
| 2018 | The Affair | Fertility Specialist | Episode #4.5 |
| 2019 | The Fix | Mr. Elias | Episode: "Making a Murderer" |
| 2021 | Chicago Med | Liam McIntyre | Episode: "Letting Go Only to Come Together" |
| 2023 | The Happy Camper | Alexander Michaels | Television film |
| 2024 | 9-1-1 | Abe | Episode: "Abandon Ships" |

== See also ==
- Eckhaus
