= Guoqi Zhang =

Guoqi Zhang from the Philips Research/Delft University of Technology, Delft, The Netherlands was named Fellow of the Institute of Electrical and Electronics Engineers (IEEE) in 2014 for contributions to heterogeneous micro/nano electronics packaging, system integration and reliability.
