= Beurs van Berlage =

Building in Amsterdam

Coordinates: 52°22′30″N 4°53′47″E

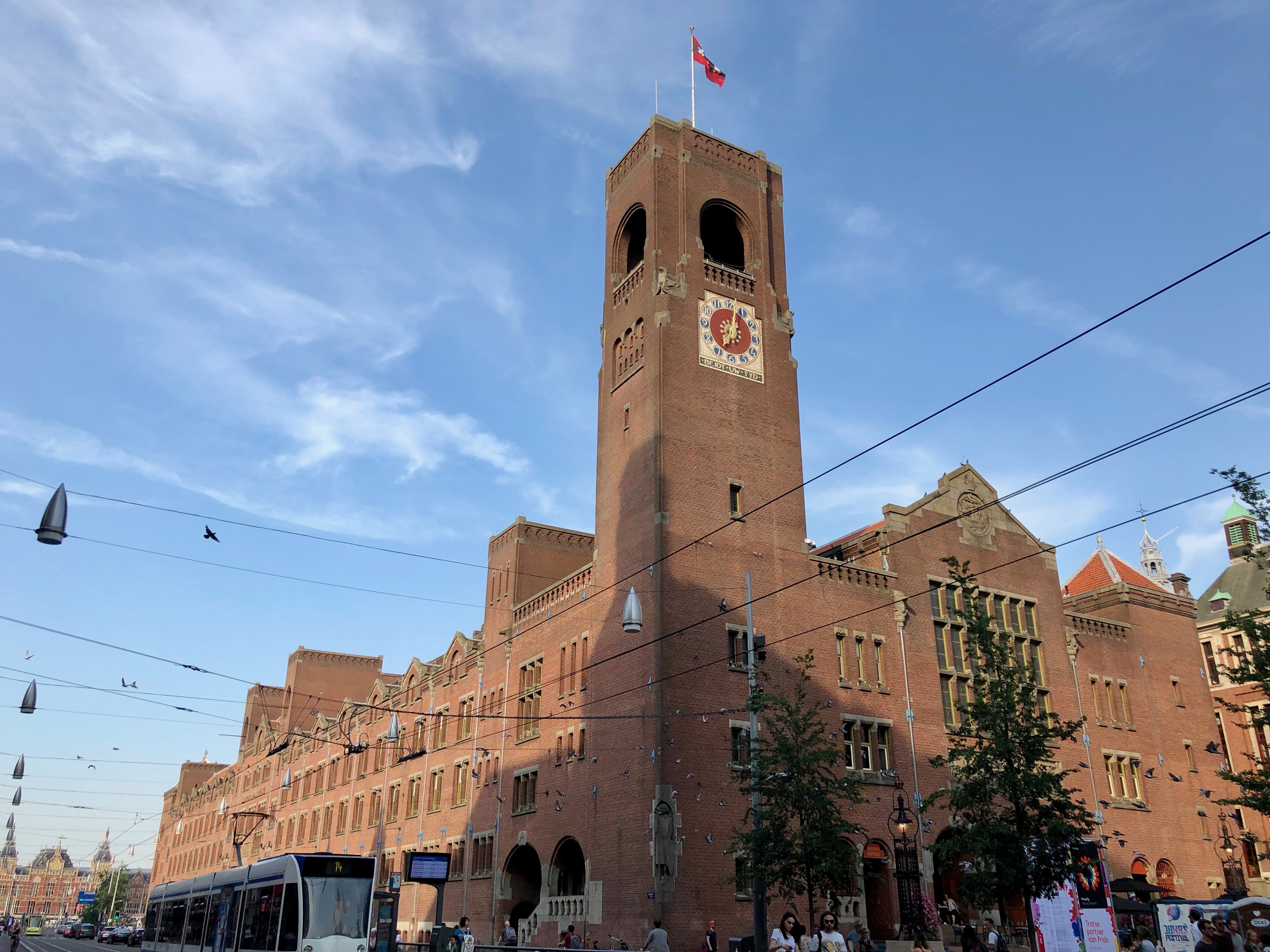
Beurs van Berlage

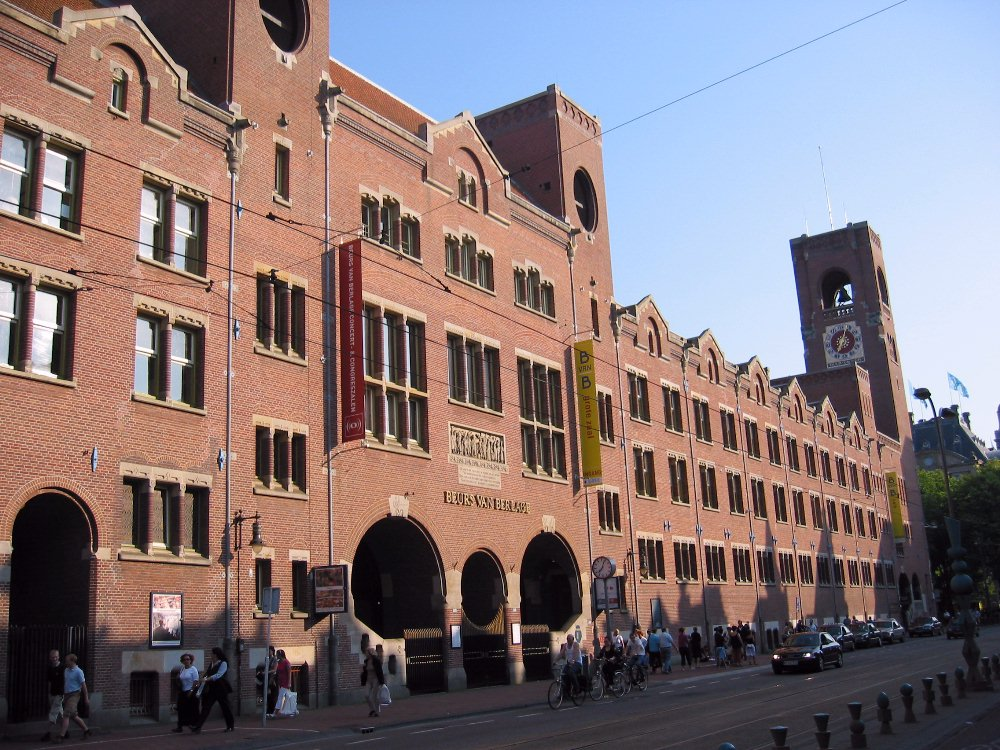
Beurs van Berlage, 2004

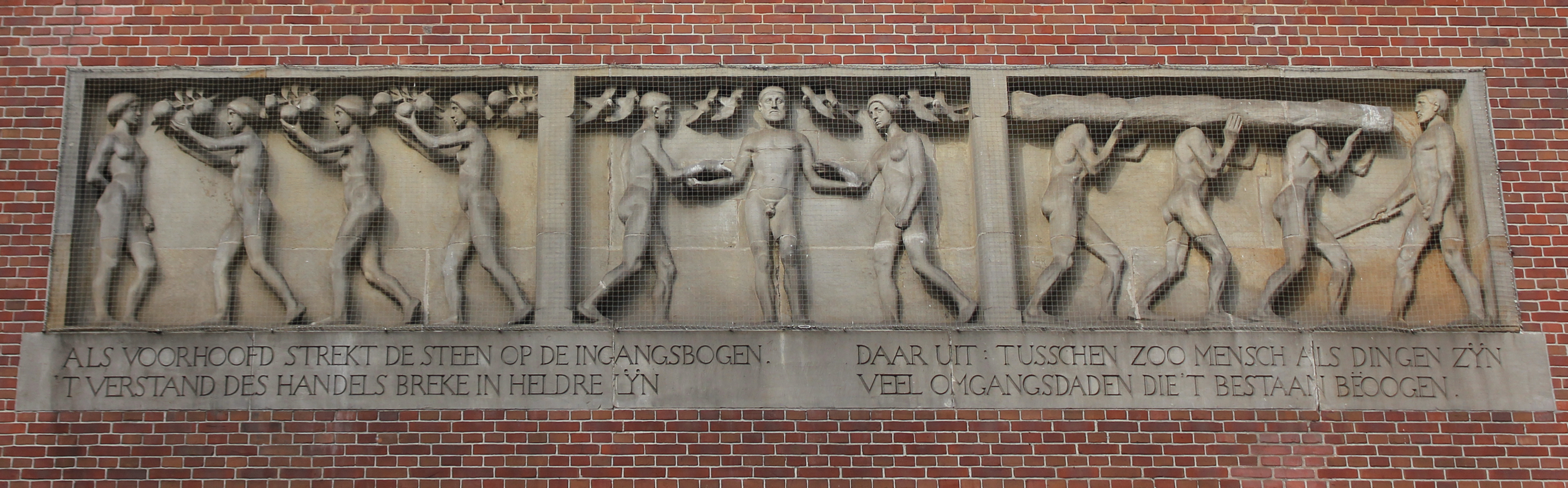
Sculptural panel on the top of entrance

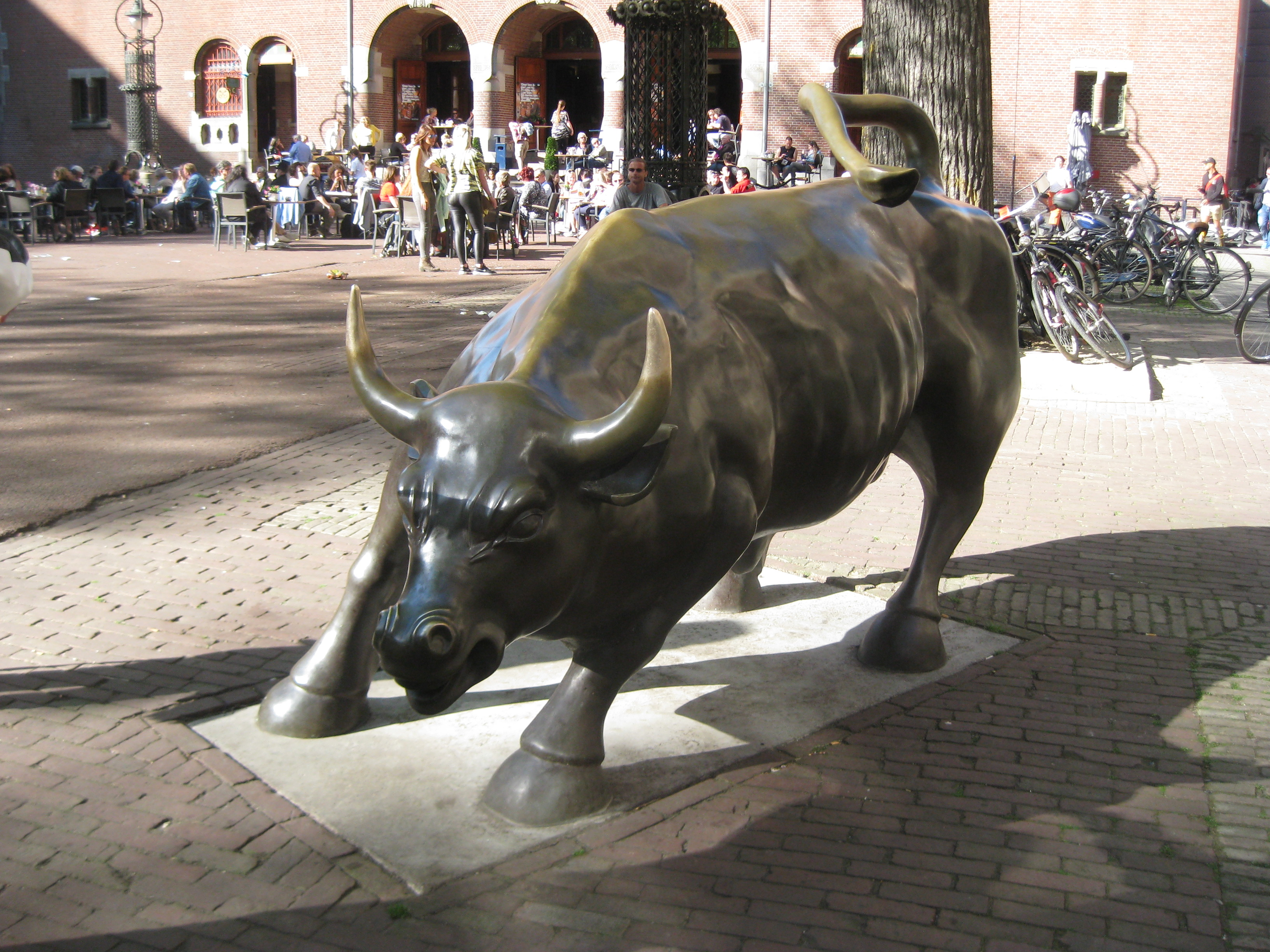
Charging Bull on Beursplein in Amsterdam.

The Beurs van Berlage (literally Berlage's stock market) is a building on the Damrak, in the centre of Amsterdam. It was designed by architect Hendrik Petrus Berlage and constructed between 1896 and 1903. It influenced many modernist architects, in particular functionalists and the Amsterdam School. It is now used as a venue for concerts, exhibitions and conferences.

The building is constructed of red brick, with an iron and glass roof, and stone piers, lintels and corbels. Its entrance is under a 40-metre-high (130 ft) clock tower, while inside lie three large multi-storey halls, with offices and communal facilities grouped around them.

The aim of the architect was to modify the styles of the past by emphasizing sweeping planes and open plan interiors. It has stylistic similarities with some earlier buildings, for instance St Pancras station and the work of H. H. Richardson in America, or the Castell dels Tres Dragons, Barcelona, by Lluís Domènech i Montaner. True to its nineteenth-century roots, it maintains the use of ornament in a civic structure.

On 2 February 2002 the civil ceremony of the wedding of King Willem-Alexander and Máxima Zorreguieta took place in the Beurs van Berlage.

The Beurs van Berlage has a café located on the Beursplein side and the tower is also open to the public.

== Development history ==
In the course of the 1870s, it became clear that Amsterdam needed a new Merchants’ Exchange. The existing Zocher Exchange of 1848 had not only become too small due to the economic upturn, but the building—nicknamed “the mausoleum”—had also fallen out of fashion stylistically. The Central Station, designed in 1876 and located opposite the old exchange, made this even more apparent.

The need for a new exchange, combined with the Central Station as the new gateway to the city, gave rise to a lengthy debate between the municipality on the one hand, and entrepreneurs organized in the Chamber of Commerce and architects organized in Architectura et Amicitia (A et A) on the other. The municipality wanted to spend as little money as possible, the entrepreneurs wanted a new exchange as quickly as possible, and the architects—led by A et A chairman Jan Springer—wanted an architectural masterpiece that would form part of a grand urban development plan connecting the Central Station with Dam Square.

=== The ‘Beursquaestie’ ===
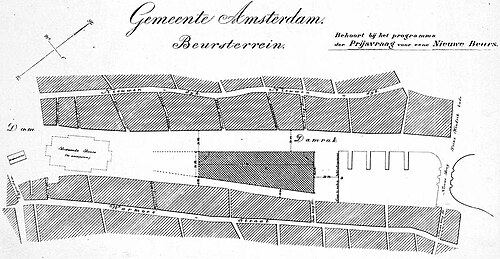
Exchange site, included in the competition program for a new exchange, 1884.

In 1879, the municipal council appointed a committee to assess the feasibility of the exchange designs that had already been submitted. On 19 November of that year, the committee issued a report, which, however, was never discussed. On 18 October 1882, the council designated the recently filled-in Damrak, between Dam Square and the Oude Brug, as the site for the new exchange. It was to be financed as much as possible by the merchants themselves, and at the initiative of Adriaan Heynsius an “exchange tax” was introduced.

In June 1883, the municipality of Amsterdam announced its intention to launch an international design competition.

However, Architectura et Amicitia (A et A) disagreed with the draft competition program that had been prepared. In the interest of its members, it wanted the competition to be restricted to a national one and demanded that the names of the jury members be announced in advance. In November, it submitted a petition to the council outlining its demands.[2] Of the four demands contained in this petition, the council adopted only one — relating to the jury procedure.[3]

Subsequently, disagreement arose over the location where the exchange should be built. The building site designated by the municipality had the advantage that no houses would need to be expropriated and that ships could still dock in the unfilled section of the Damrak. However, this resulted in an irregular, trapezoidal plot which, given the minimum required surface area for the new exchange and the limited width of the Damrak at that point, was also extremely elongated. Someone therefore mockingly remarked that “the site would be better suited to a municipal bowling alley than to an exchange building.”

At the end of December, municipal council member A. Prins, with the support of A et A, submitted a proposal to fill in the Damrak entirely and construct a square exchange building directly opposite Central Station.[4] Not long afterward, others followed Prins’s example. On 30 January 1884, the civic association Burgerplicht submitted an exchange plan for Dam Square, published in 1879 by Muysken and De Kruyff.[5] Shortly thereafter, A.L. van Gendt presented a plan for an exchange designed as a counterpart to the Royal Palace on Dam Square.[6]

All of these proposals were duly reviewed by a committee for their technical and financial feasibility, and for a time it appeared that Van Gendt’s plan would prevail. Even the Alderman for Public Works, Jac. Ankersmit, was persuaded. However, the residents of Dam Square and the Warmoesstraat demanded such exorbitant compensation for expropriation that he failed to secure approval from the municipal council. As a result, the original trapezoidal building site was ultimately reinstated in the competition program.[7]

=== Contest ===
The final competition program[1] and the composition of the jury[2] were announced on 28 June 1884. In order to prevent favoritism and nationalist sentiment, each design was submitted not under the name of its author(s), but under a motto.

Motto	Author(s)	Prize	image
Y	L.M. Cordonnier	1st prize	
In hoc signo floresco	J.F. Groll, F. Ohmann	2nd prize	
La Bourse ou la vie	J. Vollmer	3rd prize	
Mercaturae	H.P. Berlage, Th. Sanders	4th prize	
Ammerack	L. Klingenberg, E. Tauschenberg	5th prize	

The number of submissions was unexpectedly high. The 199 entries (in fact 201; two designs arrived too late) were displayed in the Rijksmuseum to be assessed by the jury.[3] The jury met for the first time on 10 November, and the final vote took place on 15 November. The jury report was published in French in the Algemeen Handelsblad.[4]

Naturally, the report met with criticism. It was considered rather brief, and there was disagreement with the jury’s requirement that the building should be “picturesque.” This requirement had not appeared in the competition program and resulted in all classical designs being excluded from the prizes, while many critics did not wish to see yet another Rijksmuseum or Central Station.[5]

Of the entries exhibited at the Rijksmuseum from 27 November to 14 December, five were invited to participate in a closed competition,[6] including the design by Berlage and his associate Sanders. In this second round, which took place in 1885, the designs were adapted to meet the jury’s wishes.[7] For this purpose, the jury drafted a new competition program, which—like the previous one—first had to be approved by the municipal council.[8]

Once again, various parties attempted to exert influence—this time with greater success. The maximum budget was fixed at 2 million guilders (rather than approximately 2 million guilders), and municipal council member Gosschalk succeeded in having the requirement removed that the five participants in the closed competition must retain “the arrangements and architectural character of their first design,” since otherwise, he argued, “one would be bringing in the Trojan horse in which [...] not Greeks [...], but the official State architectural style is concealed.”[9]

Of these five designs, the project submitted under the motto Y by the French architect L.M. Cordonnier was selected as the winner on 3 June 1885.[10] The five prize-winning designs were exhibited from 10 to 24 June at Arti et Amicitiae.

However, a reader of the journal De Opmerker discovered that design Y had been “literally copied” from the town hall in La Rochelle.[11] To convince doubters, the design Y was displayed in the shop window of Van der Land on the Kalverstraat alongside images of the town hall of La Rochelle. Subsequently, several architects sent a letter to the municipal council on 23 June, requesting that the design be carefully reconsidered.[12]

At the council meeting of 24 June, the jury report was rejected—not only because of the plagiarism issue, but also because the jury had completely disregarded the cost estimates. The executive board (Burgomaster and Aldermen) was then asked to investigate both matters.[13]

Regarding the plagiarism issue, the board referred the matter back to the jury. The jury, however, had no intention of revising its judgment, leaving the board with no choice but to accept the design. As for the budget, the board personally requested cost estimates from the first two prize-winners, Cordonnier and Groll, which—after certain economies—did not exceed the stipulated maximum of 2 million guilders.[14]

On 6 January 1886, the council met to discuss the board’s conclusions. Gosschalk described it as “a masterpiece of diplomatic art.” However, he had no confidence in the proposed “economies.” As an architect, he knew that the eventual construction costs would likely exceed the estimate and nullify the savings, and he therefore believed the project should be postponed. Moreover, 1885 had been a very poor year for trade. There was so little commercial activity that the Zocher Exchange would suffice for the time being.

Nevertheless, the report of the executive board was adopted without a vote. The sealed envelopes were then opened, and the prizes were awarded to the five winning designs—without any of the winners actually being permitted to execute their project.[15]

After this, the exchange issue was shelved for the time being, even though the exchange tax continued to be levied.

=== The ‘Official Project’ ===
In November 1886, J. Coninck Westenberg succeeded J. Ankersmit as Alderman for Public Works. The new alderman made efforts to bring the matter to a swift conclusion. He commissioned the municipal architect A.W. Weissman to produce a new design for the exchange. This plan was presented to the council on 3 May 1887 and was composed of the best elements of the first two prize-winning competition designs: the floor plan by Groll and Ohmann, praised by the exchange traders, and the architectural design of Cordonnier.[1]

By awarding the prizes, the municipality had effectively purchased these designs, and there was no legal provision preventing it from using them as it saw fit. The indignation over this course of action was considerable, and during a council meeting in February 1888 the proposal was rejected by a large majority.[2] However, the exchange tax was not abolished, and the exchange question continued to smoulder.[3]

In 1891, the matter gained momentum once again. On 22 January of that year, the Executive Board and the Chamber of Commerce agreed to build the exchange “on the section of the Damrak that has already been filled in or, if necessary, to be further filled in.”[4] When this proposal was discussed by the council on 25 January, however, it was rejected.

Instead, from three earlier plans—those of Prins, Krasnapolsky, Van Gendt and Werker—the council selected the Werker plan, which proposed constructing the exchange between Oudebrugsteeg and Papenbrugsteeg and required the expropriation of a large number of houses on the Warmoesstraat.[5] To complicate matters further, during the council meeting of 4 February it was pointed out that the report of the committee appointed in 1879 had never been discussed. The report was therefore finally taken into consideration.[6]

Ultimately, the council opted for the Werker plan, but this plan also failed after its associated expropriation proposal was rejected by the Lower House (Second Chamber) in September 1892, seemingly ending any chance of creating a boulevard along the Damrak.

Meanwhile, Amsterdam’s economic situation continued to deteriorate. In the spring of 1894, an ad hoc committee was appointed to investigate “how the existing exchange might be improved.” This proved to be feasible and would result in savings of 75%.[7]

After nearly the entire municipal council voted against constructing a new exchange on 28 February, A.W. Weissman was commissioned to design a renovation plan for the old exchange.[8] He addressed the traffic problem by removing the extensions of the Zocher Exchange, allowing traffic heading toward Central Station to pass on the left side of the building and traffic coming from Central Station to pass on the right.

However, shortly after completing these plans, Weissman was dismissed as municipal architect, and nothing further was heard of this proposal.

=== Solution ===
Meanwhile, the liberal politician Willem Treub had taken office as Alderman for Public Works. He must have been thoroughly briefed on the exchange question, for he allowed the exchange committee to work in the utmost secrecy in order to prevent “the same muddling as before from starting again.”

Subsequently, Berlage—the only Dutch winner of the closed competition of 1885—was added to the committee by the Mayor and Aldermen as an advisory member. Finally, in January 1896, he was given the commission to design the new exchange on the original competition site.[1] In June of that year he completed his plans, which were approved by the municipal council on 24 February 1897.[2]

To avoid the devastating criticism that had arisen in 1887, the public was shown only a floor plan, whose layout corresponded to Weissman’s 1894 renovation plan. Nevertheless, on 1 April 1898 Berlage gave a presentation to Architectura et Amicitia and the Amsterdam department of the Society for the Promotion of Architecture, explaining that his design was based on a system of triangles developed by Lauweriks and De Bazel.[3]

The Exchange was constructed between 1898 and 1903. On Saturday, 29 July 1899, a photo session took place at the construction site of the Exchange with H.P. Berlage, Johannes Balthazar Lambeek, Herman Walenkamp, Hendrik Jacob Dammerman Jr., J.P. Wormser, P. Vorkink, Jan de Meyer, and J.J.L. Bourdrez (the person on the far right has not yet been identified).[4][5]

However, because the exchange was built on the old riverbed of the Amstel, it began to subside during construction. Masons had to cut out the cracks that appeared and refill them with bricks.[6]

== Architecture ==
In designing the Exchange, Berlage adhered to the principle that form and ornament should closely correspond to the structure—unity in diversity. At the same time, this was also a political statement. The enormous brick walls found in the Exchange embodied, in Berlage’s view, democratic society: “as individuals insignificant, as a mass a power.”

The clock tower containing the “Beursbengel” may have been inspired by the thirteenth-century Torre del Popolo in the northern Italian city of Brescia.[1] More broadly, Romanesque and Renaissance architecture in northern Italy formed an important source of inspiration for Berlage’s Exchange, as can be seen, for example, in the Basilica of Saint Ambrose in Milan.

== Iconographic program ==
Within the framework of the Gesamtkunstwerk principle, Berlage commissioned the poet Albert Verwey to devise a decorative program for the building. This program was based on two themes: Amsterdam as an important trading city and the classless society in which money would no longer play a role. The latter theme clearly predominates.

Verwey proposed placing poems (quatrains) in the various spaces, in which these two themes repeatedly recur. These poems served as the basis for the decoration of the rooms and often refer directly to the specific function of each space.

Inspired by Verwey’s poems, several other prominent artists created a wide range of artworks:

Exterior:

- Sculptures of Gijsbrecht van Aemstel, Jan Pieterszoon Coen, and Hugo de Groot, as well as keystones representing fishing, industry, and hunting, by Lambertus Zijl.
- Verses by Albert Verwey, carved by Lambertus Zijl.

Interior:

- Tile panels depicting Past, Present, and Future by Jan Toorop.
- Decorative brick motifs (the wall conceived as a tapestry).
- A terracotta relief by Lambertus Zijl (The Progress of Humanity).
- Verses by Albert Verwey.
- Murals Industry and Trade by Richard Roland Holst.
- Ceramic friezes (Labour) by Jan Toorop.
- Stained-glass windows by Antoon Derkinderen (Virtues of Amsterdam; Morning; Evening; Trade; Industry; Freedom and Health; the Amsterdam City Maiden).
- Meeting rooms decorated by Joseph Mendes da Costa.
- Among other elements, lamps, hardware, furniture, and railings designed by Berlage himself.

== Meaning ==
Stylistically, the Exchange is difficult to categorize. Traces of Neo-Romanesque and strongly simplified Art Nouveau features can be discerned (notably influences of Gottfried Semper), while the building is also regarded as a precursor to both the Nieuwe Bouwen (New Building movement) and the Amsterdam School—although the latter movement was in part a reaction to the strict character of the Exchange.

In fact, the Exchange should be seen as the building in which the rationalization already initiated by Cuypers (both Cuypers and Berlage were strongly inspired by the ideas of Viollet-le-Duc) definitively “tilts” toward modernism. For this reason, Berlage’s style is often described as Rationalism.

In 1999, the Berlage Exchange was included by the Union Internationale des Architectes on a list of the 1,000 most important buildings of the twentieth century.

In the summer of 2006, the newspaper Het Parool referred to the Berlage Exchange in an article as the “Night Watch of Architecture.”

== Functions 1903–1998: the Merchants’ Exchange ==
When designing the Exchange, Berlage had idealistic visions of a building in which art, culture, economy, and society would come together.

However, the primary purpose of the Exchange was, of course, trade. It housed the commodities and grain exchange as well as securities trading, but also facilities for the municipal and national telephone services, a coffee house, meeting rooms, a post office, a caretaker’s residence, a police station, and a neighborhood administrative office. Over time, space was also allocated within the Commodities Exchange for the insurance exchange and currency trading. Berlage likewise designed an impressive boardroom and adjoining staircase for the Amsterdam Chamber of Commerce.

As early as 1912, the stock exchange moved to the newly constructed building at Beursplein 5. The main reason for this relocation was the rapid growth of securities trading. In truth, however, the traders had never felt entirely at home in Berlage’s modern and idealistic creation. This was also reflected in the style of the new building: with a pediment and pilasters, it marked a complete return to nineteenth-century architecture.

In 1961, with the (temporary) arrival of the Institute for Industrial Design, the gradual departure of the exchanges began. The last to leave was the Options Exchange in 1987, which until then had been housed in the former Grain Exchange Hall.

In 1986, the Exchange building was considered as a possible location in the competition to house the Netherlands Architecture Institute, but Rotterdam ultimately won that contest.

The very last financial activity to leave Berlage’s Exchange was the Agricultural Futures Market, which remained housed in a small hall on the first floor until 1998.

== Functions 1985–2008 ==
In 1985, a new chapter began in the history of the Beurs van Berlage. The Municipality of Amsterdam (the owner) decided that the Exchange should be given a public-cultural function. To this end, the building was more or less divided into two parts:

=== The Northern Section ===
This section was formerly used for rehearsals and offices by the Netherlands Philharmonic Orchestra (NedPhO). The orchestra converted the Grain Exchange Hall and the Securities Exchange Hall into rehearsal and concert spaces. In the Securities Exchange Hall, a stage and fixed seating arrangement were installed. The stage is a replica of the stage in the Concertgebouw.

In the Grain Exchange Hall, a bold glass structure was inserted containing an auditorium for chamber orchestra music. The design by architect Pieter Zaanen (Zaanen Spanjers cs Architecten BNA|BNI) and structural engineer Mick Eekhout (Octatube BV) received international attention and was awarded, among other distinctions, the prestigious American Architectural Record Award.

However, many heritage organizations were far from pleased with these alterations. In particular, the loss of the important sightlines from the south side to the north side and vice versa, as well as the installation of the “Concertgebouw” stage, were—and still are—regarded by many as significant intrusions into Berlage’s masterpiece. Nevertheless, because all of Zaanen’s interventions were carried out in a reversible manner, approval was ultimately granted.

In 2008, a new ownership structure for the Beurs van Berlage was established (see below). It was then decided that the Netherlands Philharmonic Orchestra would have to relocate to another site by 31 December 2012 (or earlier). As a result, the spaces formerly used by the orchestra became available for other activities.

As of 2018, the northern section has been used by a company offering workspace facilities.

=== The Southern Section ===
In the southern part (Great Hall, Café, Berlage Hall, and others), the “Stichting Beurs van Berlage” (Berlage Exchange Foundation) established itself. Originally, its aim was to organize exhibitions in the fields of architecture and applied arts (for example: Frank Lloyd Wright, Advertising Heroes, and 100 Years of Housing). In addition, the halls are used for a wide range of events, meetings, conferences, and conventions, pursuing a mix of commercial and public-cultural activities.

Typical recurring events include the Bokbier Festival, the annual Lintjesregen (Royal Honours Ceremony), Heineken NV shareholders’ meetings, Women Inc. gatherings, and the sales exhibition “Rietveld to the Beurs.” After subsidies from the Amsterdam Arts Council were discontinued in 2004, the primary focus on exhibitions was reduced. Since then, the Foundation has produced few, if any, exhibitions itself but has sought to strengthen collaboration with external exhibition makers. This led, for example, to the 2005 exhibition In the Footsteps of Elvis. The widely discussed exhibitions Rembrandt, all his Paintings (featuring reproductions of all 350 Rembrandt paintings) and Bodies: The Exhibition (with real human bodies and body parts) followed in 2006 and 2007.

In the former main entrance at Beursplein, the Beurs van Berlage Café was established in 1991 as a subsidiary of the Foundation. The café-restaurant was closed from 1994 to 2002 due to operational difficulties. It was successfully reopened in 2002, with the bar originally designed by Zaanen replaced by a new design by artist Marc Ruygrok. Around the bar, in large illuminated letters, one can read the text “We zijn hier” (“We are here”). This text is a contemporary reference to the inscriptions by Albert Verwey on the tower of the Exchange: “Beidt uw tyd” (“Bide your time”) and “Duur uw uur” (“Your hour is precious”), which themselves appear to respond to the proverb “De cost gaet voor de baet uyt” (“Cost precedes profit”) inscribed on the cornice of the late eighteenth-century Bureau for Commercial Intelligence on the Damrak. The striking contrast between Ruygrok’s modern design and the three large tile panels “Past–Present–Future” by Jan Toorop is also noteworthy.

=== The Royal Wedding ===
On 2 February 2002, the Beurs van Berlage reached a symbolic high point as a “Palazzo Pubblico”: the Municipality of Amsterdam designated the Great Hall— with the consent of the couple— as the location for the civil wedding of Crown Prince Willem-Alexander and Princess Máxima. The ceremony was conducted by the Mayor of Amsterdam, Job Cohen.

== Restoration 1998–2004 ==
Between 1998 and 2004, the Beurs van Berlage underwent a large-scale restoration. The primary impetus for this restoration was the decision to construct the North/South Line of the Amsterdam metro. Because this metro line was to be excavated using an advanced new technique, the foundations of all surrounding buildings had to be inspected.

Since its early years, the Exchange had suffered from subsidence, in some cases very severe. Berlage himself had already carried out major interventions in 1907 to address this issue. Nevertheless, the foundation problems had always remained significant and had been treated over the years with temporary fixes. As the risks associated with the construction of the North/South Line were considered too great, it was decided that the Exchange would receive an entirely new foundation, followed by a comprehensive interior and exterior restoration.

The well-known Amsterdam architect Walter Kramer was commissioned to carry out the restoration. The structural design was by Dirk Klopper, a renowned Amsterdam restoration engineer from Evers Partners. The solution involved installing screw injection piles throughout the entire basement. These piles were driven down to the so-called second sand layer, approximately 20 meters below Amsterdam Ordnance Datum (NAP). Across the full surface of the basement, a concrete foundation slab was constructed, which—through recesses in the masonry—was designed to support the superstructure.

Special points of attention during the restoration included the complete reconstruction of the former Safe Deposit (vaults) in the basement beneath the Café, and the striking “new” exterior color scheme, which was based on original colors identified through meticulous research. All façades and the clock tower were cleaned.

== 2008 – Present: New Ownership Structure ==
In the 1980s, the Beurs van Berlage was given a social function, hosting concerts and events. Due to high foundation repair costs and low rental income, the owner (Amsterdam City District Centre) sold the building in 2008. Four public and private parties purchased the property and took over its operation.

Since then, the Beurs van Berlage has operated as a limited partnership with four equal partners: the Gemeente Amsterdam, De Key, Amvest, and BPD.

The new Beurs van Berlage Limited Partnership aims to provide the building with a (renewed) purpose centered on the core concepts of “social,” “creative,” and “cultural.” In addition, the Beurs van Berlage plays a central role in the 1012 Project (the revitalization of Amsterdam’s city center and De Wallen) and the “Red Carpet” Project (the upgrading of the Damrak–Rokin–Vijzelstraat route).

The fences surrounding the exterior of the building were removed to make it more accessible to the public, and ground-floor spaces were given public functions. Within the building, conferences and events are organized. The revenue generated from these activities is reinvested in the maintenance of the property.

== Palazzo Pubblico Foundation ==
The Stichting Palazzo Pubblico Amsterdam (SPPA), founded in 2021, is committed to keeping the Beurs van Berlage accessible to a broad public.

The foundation raises subsidies and donations to support cultural and educational activities.

== Reference Works ==
The above texts are based, among other sources, on the following books:

- Hendrik Petrus Berlage, Het complete werk - Sergio Pollano, Atrium ISBN 90-6113-280-0
- Beurs van Berlage - Jan Derwig/Jouke van der Werf, ISBN 90-76863-03-2
- De Beurs van Berlage, Historie en herstel - Walter Kramer, Waanders ISBN 9040088292
- De inrichting van de Beurs van Berlage - Bock/Bruys/Duysters/Lugtigheid/Schilt/v.d.Werf, Waanders ISBN 9789040088292
