= Wiktor Eckhaus =

Polish–Dutch mathematician (1930-2000)

- Born: 28 June 1930; Stanisławów, Poland
- Died: 1 October 2000 (aged 70); Amstelveen, Netherlands
- Education: Massachusetts Institute of Technology
- Known for: Eckhaus instability Eckhaus equation
- Scientific career
- Fields: mathematics, aerodynamics
- Workplaces: Utrecht University, Delft University of Technology, National Aerospace Laboratory
- Doctoral advisor: Leon Trilling
- Doctoral students: Arjen Doelman

Wiktor Eckhaus (28 June 1930 – 1 October 2000) was a Polish–Dutch mathematician, known for his work on the field of differential equations. He was Professor Emeritus of Applied Mathematics at the Utrecht University.

== Biography ==
Eckhaus was born into a wealthy family, and raised in Warsaw where his father was managing a fur company. During the German occupation of Poland, he, his mother and sister had to hide because of their Jewish descent. His father, after being a prisoner of war, joined the Russian Army. After the war, in 1947, the re-united family came to Amsterdam – via a refugee camp in Austria.

Wiktor passed the state exam of the Hogere Burgerschool in 1948, and started to study aeronautics at the Delft University of Technology. Following his graduation he worked with the National Aerospace Laboratory in Amsterdam, from 1953 till 1957. In the period 1957–1960 he worked at the Massachusetts Institute of Technology, where Eckhaus earned a PhD in 1959 under Leon Trilling on a dissertation entitled "Some problems of unsteady flow with discontinuities".

In 1960, he became a "maître de recherches" (senior research fellow) at the Department of Mechanics of the Sorbonne. In 1964 he was a visiting professor at the University of Amsterdam and the Mathematical Centre. Thereafter, in 1965, he became professor at the Delft University of Technology, in pure and applied mathematics and mechanics. From 1972 until his retirement in 1994, Eckhaus was professor of applied mathematics at the Utrecht University.

Initially he studied the flow around airfoils, leading to his research on the stability of solutions to (weakly) nonlinear differential equations. This resulted in what is now known as the Eckhaus instability criterion and Eckhaus instability, appearing for instance as a secondary instability in models of Rayleigh–Bénard convection. Later, Eckhaus worked on singular perturbation theory and soliton equations.

In 1983 he treated strongly singular relaxation oscillations – called "canards" (French for "ducks") – resulting in his most-read paper "Relaxation oscillations including a standard chase on French ducks". Eckhaus used standard methods of analysis, on a problem qualified before, by Marc Diener, as an example of a problem only treatable through the use of non-standard analysis.

He became a member of the Royal Netherlands Academy of Arts and Sciences in 1987.

== Publications ==
- Eckhaus, W. (1965), Studies in nonlinear stability theory, Springer Tracts in Natural Philosophy, vol. 6, Springer, ISBN 978-3-642-88319-4
- —— (1973), Matched asymptotic expansions and singular perturbations, Mathematics Studies, vol. 6, North Holland, ISBN 978-0-7204-2600-7
- —— (1979), Asymptotic analysis of singular perturbations, Studies in Mathematics and its Applications, vol. 9, North Holland, ISBN 978-0-444-85306-6
- ——; van Harten, A. (1981), The inverse scattering transformation and the theory of solitons – An introduction, Mathematics Studies, vol. 50, North Holland, ISBN 978-0-444-55731-5
- —— (1975), "New approach to the asymptotic theory of nonlinear oscillations and wave propagation", Journal of Mathematical Analysis and Applications, 49 (3): 575–611, doi:10.1016/0022-247X(75)90200-0
- —— (1983), "Relaxation oscillations including a standard chase on French ducks", in Verhulst, F. (ed.), Asymptotic Analysis II —, Lecture Notes in Mathematics, vol. 985, Springer, pp. 449–494, doi:10.1007/BFb0062381, ISBN 978-3-540-12286-9
- —— (1993), "The Ginzburg–Landau manifold is an attractor", Journal of Nonlinear Science, 3 (1): 329–348, Bibcode:1993JNS.....3..329E, doi:10.1007/BF02429869, S2CID 122662589
- ——; de Jager, E.M. (1966), "Asymptotic solutions of singular perturbation problems for linear differential equations of elliptic type", Arch. Rat. Mech. Anal., 23 (1): 26–86, Bibcode:1966ArRMA..23...26E, doi:10.1007/BF00281135, S2CID 843282
- —— (1997), Witus en de jaren van angst – Een reconstructie [Witus and the years of fear – A reconstruction] (Autobiography) (in Dutch), Bas Lubberhuizen, ISBN 9789073978690
