= Marinus Jan Granpré Molière =

Dutch architect (1883–1972)

Marinus Jan Granpré Molière

Marinus Jan Granpré Molière (Oudenbosch, 13 October 1883 – Wassenaar, 13 February 1972) was a Dutch architect. His work was part of the architecture event in the art competition at the 1924 Summer Olympics.

Granpré Molière was a professor at the Delft University of Technology and was seen as founder of the Traditionalist School. Molière initiated numerous urban projects, such as on the newly reclaimed land of the Wieringermeer (from 1927) and the Noordoostpolder (from 1937).

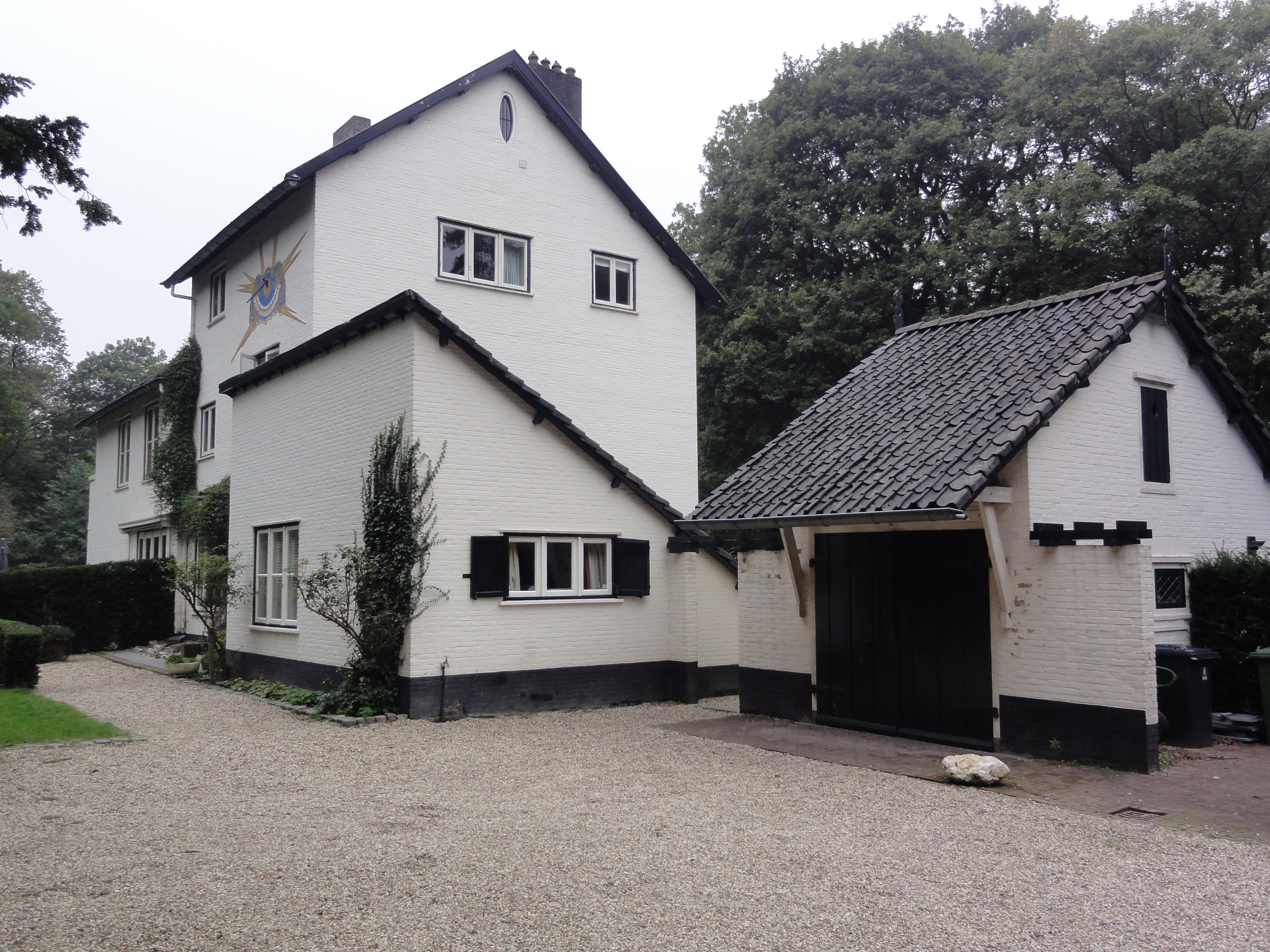
Villa Eversweg 2, Nijmegen

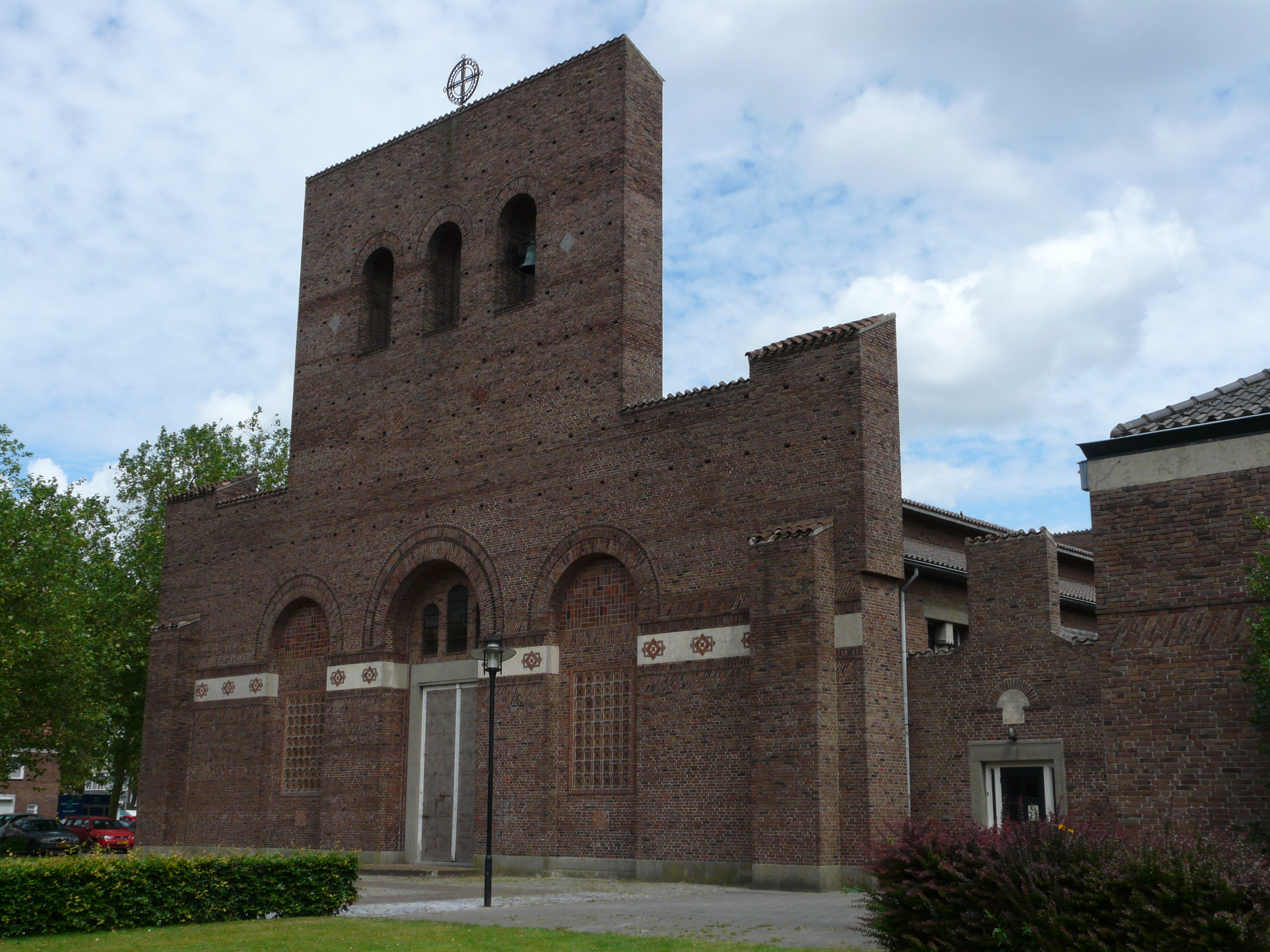
Onze Lieve Vrouwe Altijd Durende Bijstand in Breda

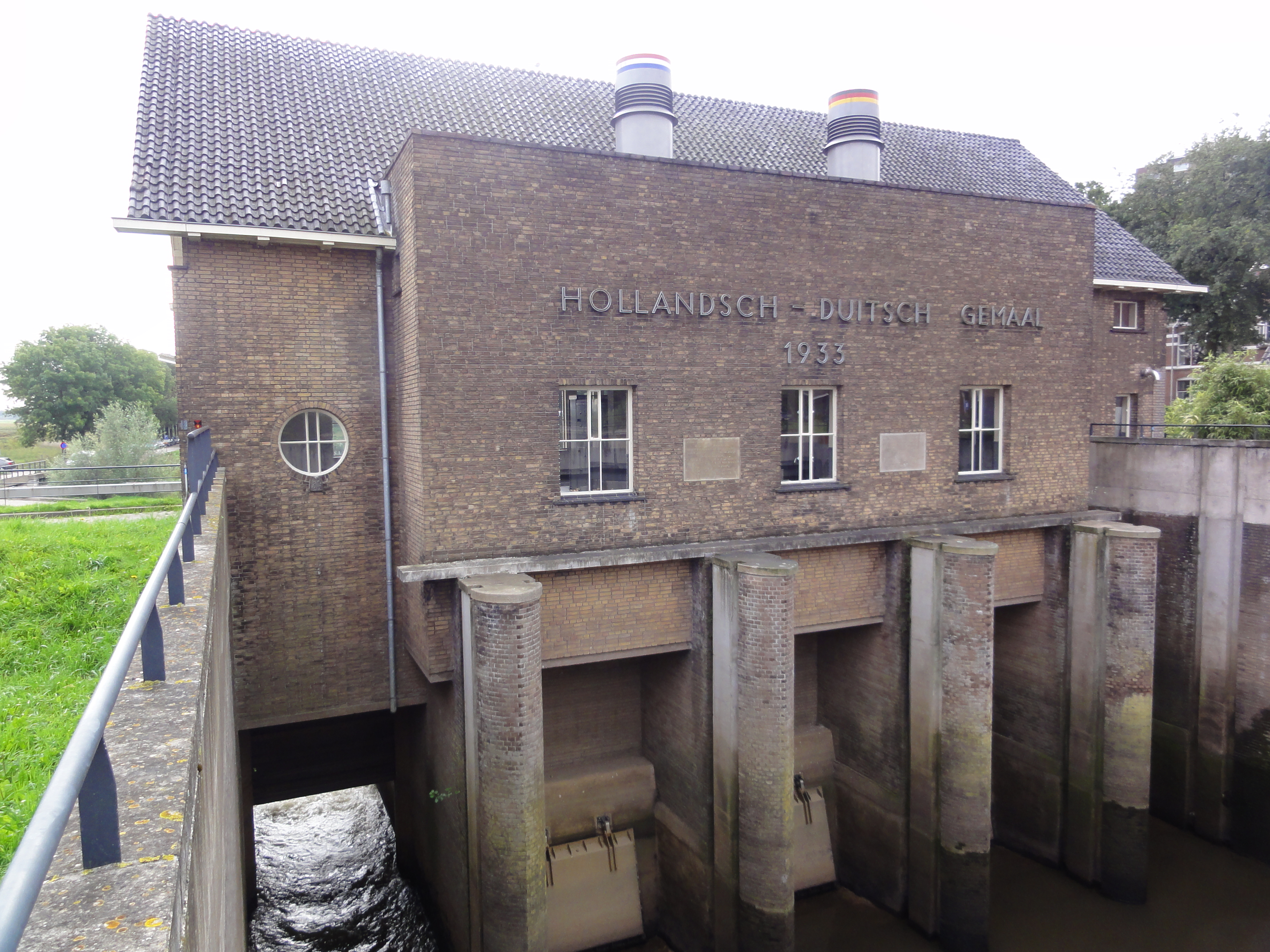
Pumping station Nijmegen

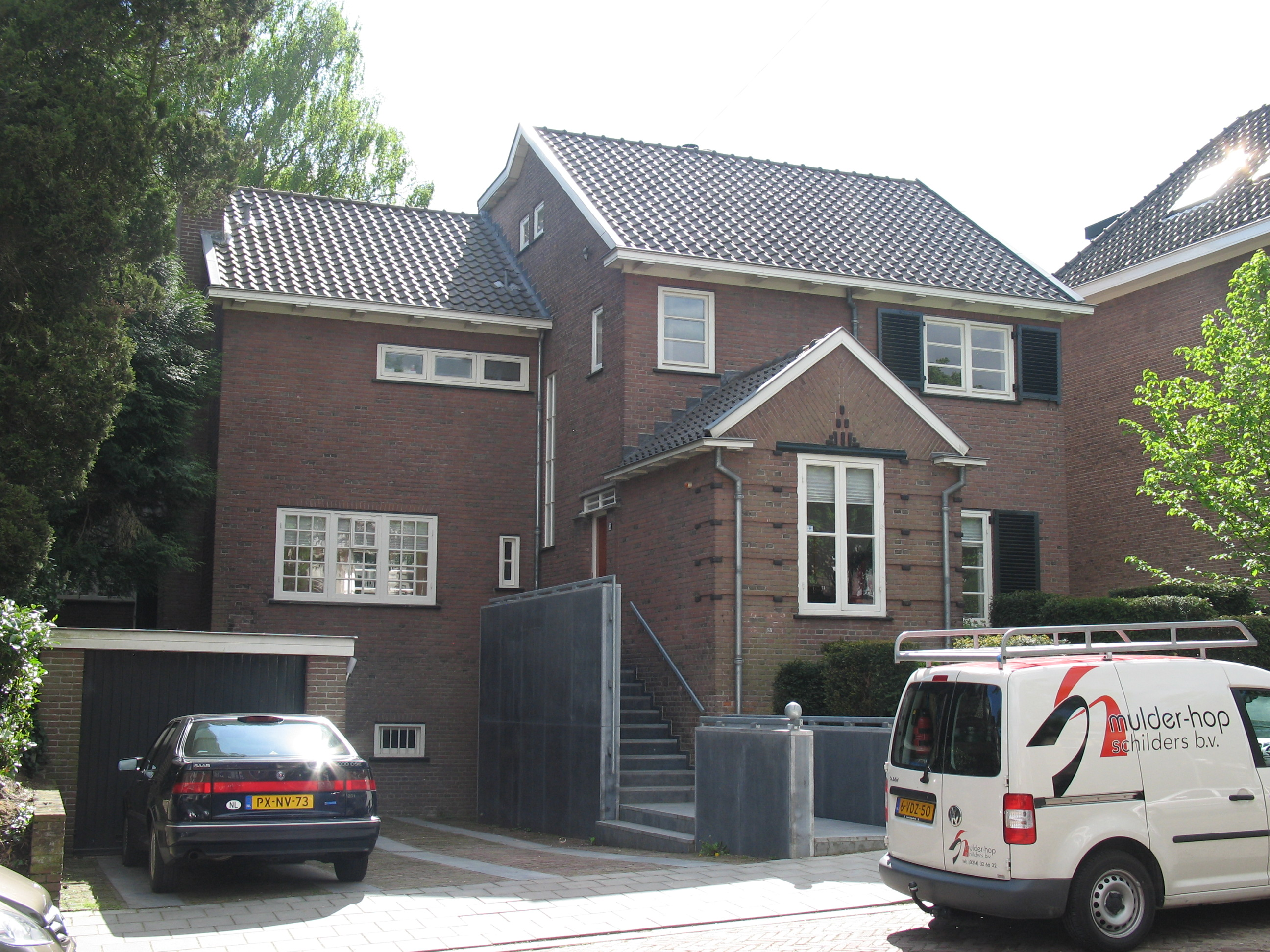
Van Lawick van Pabststraat 33, Arnhem

== Publications ==
- J.A. Kuiper: Visueel & dynamisch. De stedebouw van Granpré Molière en Verhagen 1915–1950. Delft, 1991
- Woorden en werken van Prof. Ir. Granpré Molière. Heemstede, 1949
