= List of shipwrecks in November 1865 =

The list of shipwrecks in November 1865 includes ships sunk, foundered, wrecked, grounded, or otherwise lost during November 1865.

== 1 November ==
List of shipwrecks: 1 November 1865
Ship	State	Description
Culloden, and Rover	United Kingdom	The schooner Rover dragged her anchors and was driven into the full-rigged ship Culloden in the River Mersey. Culloden sank with the loss of four of the 22 people on board. Survivors were rescued by the steamship Earl of Runcorn, tug Wonder, a schooner anchored in the Sloyne (all United Kingdom), and a boat from HMS Donegal (Royal Navy) Culloden was on a voyage from Liverpool, Lancashire to Portland, Maine, United States. Rover also sank. Her crew were rescued by Wonder and a boat from HMS Donegal.
Queely Shiel	United Kingdom	The schooner was driven ashore at South Shields, County Durham. Her crew survived. She was refloated and taken in to South Shields.
Thomas	United Kingdom	The scow sank at Port Glasgow, Renfrewshire with the loss of both of her crew.

== 2 November ==
List of shipwrecks: 2 November 1865
Ship	State	Description
Felicie	France	The ship was driven ashore at the Pass A L'Outre Lighthouse, Louisiana, United States. She was on a voyage from Bordeaux, Gironde to New Orleans, Louisiana.
J. W. Johnston	United Kingdom	The brig was wrecked at Las Palmas, Canary Islands.
Juventa	United Kingdom	The full-rigged ship ran aground at the mouth of the Mississippi River.
Princess Royal	United Kingdom	The ship was driven ashore in the Mississippi River. She was on a voyage from Liverpool to New Orleans.

== 3 November ==
List of shipwrecks: 3 November 1865
Ship	State	Description
Acastus	United Kingdom	The ship was abandoned in the Atlantic Ocean. Her crew were rescued by Royal William (United Kingdom). Acastus was on a voyage from Swansea, Glamorgan to Lisbon, Portugal.
Alice	United Kingdom	The ship ran aground on the Brake Sand, off the coast of Kent. She was on a voyage from Newcastle upon Tyne, Northumberland to Rouen, Seine-Inférieure, France. She was refloated and taken in to Ramsgate, Kent in a leaky condition.
Eliza	United Kingdom	The schooner ran aground at Lindisfarne, Northumberland. She was on a voyage from Sunderland, County Durham to Dundee, Forfarshire. She was refloated.
Jessamine	United Kingdom	The ship ran aground on the Piper Sands, in the North Sea off the north coast of Norfolk. She was on a voyage from Sunderland, County Durham to Wells-next-the-Sea, Norfolk. She was refloated and towed in to Wells-next-the-Sea.
Murillo	Spain	The steamship collided with a French Navy warship and sank in the English Channel off the South Foreland, Kent, United Kingdom. She was on a voyage from London, United Kingdom to Seville, Spain.
Vesta	United Kingdom	The ship caught fire and was driven ashore on Læsø, Denmark.

== 4 November ==
List of shipwrecks: 4 November 1865
Ship	State	Description
Jane Brown	United Kingdom	The barque foundered in the Atlantic Ocean. Her eleven crew took to two boats. Seven crew in one boat landed at Saint Vincent on 15 November. Those in the other boat were reported missing.
Strathleven	United Kingdom	The ship was abandoned in the Atlantic Ocean 200 nautical miles (370 km) north east of Newfoundland, British North America with the loss of two of her crew. She was on a voyage from Demerara, British Guiana to Glasgow, Renfrewshire.

== 5 November ==
List of shipwrecks: 5 November 1865
Ship	State	Description
Athol	United Kingdom	The schooner ran aground on the Black Neb Rocks, in the Strangford Lough. She was on a voyage from Ardrossan, Ayrshire to Strangford, County Down. She was refloated with assistance and taken in to Strangford in a severely leaky condition.
Craigievar	(United Kingdom of Great Britain and Ireland) New Zealand	The brig was wrecked at Hokitika during a massive flood on the Hokitika River. She had been in the lagoon at the river's mouth ready to depart, but was caught by the flood and driven over the bar before being washed onto a beach.
Doitje	France	The ship ran aground on the Kentish Knock. She was on a voyage from Leith, Lothian, United Kingdom to Cette, Hérault. She was refloated and taken in to Harwich, Essex, United Kingdom in a leaky condition.
Dolphin	(United Kingdom of Great Britain and Ireland) New Zealand	The schooner was wrecked at Hokitika during a massive flood on the Hokitika River. She was torn from her mooring and driven over a sandbar before been driven on shore and breaking up.
Itata	United Kingdom	The barque was driven ashore and wrecked at San Antonio, Chile.
Queen of Avon	United Kingdom	The barque was wrecked on Dassen Island, Cape Colony. Her crew survived. She was on a voyage from Cardiff, Glamorgan to Table Bay.
Sarah	(United Kingdom of Great Britain and Ireland) New Zealand	The schooner was lost at Hokitika during a massive flood on the Hokitika River. She was torn from her mooring and driven out to sea before breaking up, with the loss of either one or two lives.
Savannah	United States	The full-rigged ship collided with Mayflower (Flag unknown) and sank in the Savannah River at Hickory Bend, 28 or 35 nautical miles (52 or 65 km) upstream of Savannah, Georgia. She was refloated.

== 6 November ==
List of shipwrecks: 6 November 1865
Ship	State	Description
Cecilie Caroline	France	The ship was driven ashore at Calais. She was on a voyage from Sunderland, County Durham, United Kingdom to Morlaix, Finistère. She was refloated the next day and taken in to Calais.
George and Jane	United Kingdom	The schooner collided with another vessel and foundered off Milford Haven, Pembrokeshire. Her crew survived. She was on a voyage from Cardigan to Saundersfoot, Pembrokeshire.
Jacob Bell	United States	The decommissioned sidewheel paddle steamer foundered in the North Atlantic Ocean off the United States East Coast while under tow from Washington, D.C., to New York by the sidewheel paddle steamer USS Banshee (United States Navy).
Shannon	United Kingdom	The ship ran aground off Diego Garcia. She was on a voyage from Liverpool, Lancashire to Bombay, India.

== 7 November ==
List of shipwrecks: 7 November 1865
Ship	State	Description
Elizabeth Morrow	United Kingdom	The ship departed from Swatow for Chefoo, China. No further trace, presumed foundered with the loss of all hands.
Savoir Faire	United Kingdom	The ship ran aground on the Arklow Bank, in the Irish Sea off the coast of County Wicklow. All but seven of her crew were taken off by the Rosslare Lifeboat. She was on a voyage from Liverpool, Lancashire to Calcutta, India. Savoir Faire was refloated on 12 November and towed in to Kingstown, County Dublin by two tugs.

== 8 November ==
List of shipwrecks: 8 November 1865
Ship	State	Description
Beagle	United Kingdom	The steamship was run down and sunk by the steamship Napoli off Cumbrae, Argyllshire. Her crew were rescued by the tug Pearl (United Kingdom. Beagle was on a voyage from Belfast, County Antrim to Glasgow, Renfrewshire.
Louisa Ann	United Kingdom	The ship was driven ashore at Sandwich, Kent. She was on a voyage from Mazagan, Morocco to Sunderland, County Durham.

== 9 November ==
List of shipwrecks: 9 November 1865
Ship	State	Description
Laurel	(United Kingdom of Great Britain and Ireland) British North America	The schooner was wrecked off Anticosti Island, Nova Scotia. Her crew survived. She was on a voyage from Labrador to Quebec City, Province of Canada.
Lermont	United Kingdom	The ship collided with the barque Lady Jane (United Kingdom) in the Baltic Sea. She was consequently abandoned on 11 November. Her crew were rescued by Abraham (Norway). Lermont was on a voyage from Kronstadt, Russia to Grimsby, Lincolnshire.
Rambler	United Kingdom	The ship foundered 6 nautical miles (11 km) north east of Cape Ray, Newfoundland, British North America. voyage from Gaspé, Province of Canada, British North America to Viana do Castelo, Portugal.

== 10 November ==
List of shipwrecks: 10 November 1865
Ship	State	Description
HMS Bristol	Royal Navy	The Bristol-class frigate ran aground off the Nore during her sea trials. She was refloated and sailed for Portsmouth, Hampshire.
Hector	United Kingdom	The steamship ran around on the Codling Bank, in the Irish Sea off the coast of County Wicklow. She was on a voyage from Liverpool, Lancashire to Alexandria, Egypt. She was refloated and towed in to Kingstown, County Dublin.
J. W.	United Kingdom	The ship was wrecked at Sines, Portugal. Her crew were rescued.
Patroon	United States	The 237-ton screw steamer sank at Brazos, Texas.
Pratt	United Kingdom	The brig was wrecked at Sines.
Venus	United Kingdom	The ship ran aground on The Shingles, in the Thames Estuary and sank. She was on a voyage from London to Sierra Leone.

== 11 November ==
List of shipwrecks: 11 November 1865
Ship	State	Description
Aldersons	United Kingdom	The steamship ran aground on the Longsand, in the North Sea off the coast of Essex. She was on a voyage from Sunderland, County Durham to Bordeaux, Gironde, France. She was refloated with the assistance of some smacks and put in to Harwich, Essex.
Ann Coppin	United Kingdom	The ship was driven ashore north of Ayr. She was on a voyage from Londonderry to Ayr. She was refloated the next day and taken in to Ayr.
Brazil	United States	The 211-ton sternwheel paddle steamer sank with the loss of two lives after colliding with the bark Plymouth (Flag unknown).
Curlew	United States	The ship was destroyed by fire in the North Sea 18 nautical miles (33 km) off Lowestoft, Suffolk. Her crew were rescued. She was on a voyage from Charleston, South Carolina to Hamburg.
Dora	United Kingdom	The ship departed from Shanghai for Foo Chow Foo, China. No further trace, presumed foundered with the loss of all hands.
May Flower	United States	The 57-ton screw steamer was lost on the Detroit River in Michigan.
Nereid	United Kingdom	The barque was abandoned in the Atlantic Ocean. in a sinking condition. Her eight crew reached Faial Island, Azores in a boat. She was on a voyage from Sierra Leone to Liverpool, Lancashire.
Sarah Louise	United States	The full-rigged ship was driven ashore in a storm on the coast of California about 21 miles (34 km) northwest of Tennessee Cove.

== 12 November ==
List of shipwrecks: 12 November 1865
Ship	State	Description
Chevy Chase	United Kingdom	The barque departed from the River Tyne for Cartagena, Spain. Presumed foundered in the English Channel with the loss of all eleven crew, a lifeboat from the ship washed up on the Isle of Wight. Her longboat washed up at Swanage, Dorset on 28 November.
Gertrude	United Kingdom	The steamship was driven ashore at Riga, Russia. She broke in two the next day.
Ocean Ranger	United Kingdom	The ship was driven ashore and wrecked near Malahide, County Dublin. All nineteen people on board survived. She was on a voyage from Liverpool, Lancashire to Savannah, Georgia, United States of America.
Parsee	United Kingdom	The ship was abandoned in the South China Sea. All on board were rescued by Therese (United Kingdom). Parsec was on a voyage from Swatow to Shanghai, China.
Sarah	United Kingdom	The sloop collided with the brigantine Alberta (United Kingdom) and sank off the Middle Lightship ( Trinity House). Her crew were rescued by Alberta. Sarah was on a voyage from London to Ipswich, Suffolk.

== 13 November ==
List of shipwrecks: 13 November 1865
Ship	State	Description
Aenid	(United Kingdom of Great Britain and Ireland) New South Wales	Three huge waves struck the wooden cutter in the Tasman Sea at Long Reef off New South Wales swamping and wrecking her with the loss of two lives. Four others on board survived. The wreck later was found washed up on Long Reef.
Catherine	United Kingdom	The schooner was driven ashore at Hela, Prussia. She was refloated and taken in to Danzig.
Greyhound	(United Kingdom of Great Britain and Ireland) British North America	The steamship ran aground off Beaver Harbour, Nova Scotia and sank. All on board were rescued. She was on a voyage from Boston, Massachusetts to Halifax, Nova Scotia and Charlottetown, Prince Edward Island.
Tom Scott	United Kingdom	The ship ran aground off St Cuthbert's Head, Pembrokeshire. she was on a voyage from Truro, Cornwall to Llanelly, Glamorgan or vice versa. She was refloated the next day.

== 14 November ==
List of shipwrecks: 14 November 1865
Ship	State	Description
Arzo	Italy	The ship was driven ashore at Sea Palling, Norfolk, United Kingdom. All 21 people on board were rescued by the Palling Lifeboat Parsee ( Royal National Lifeboat Institution). Arzo was on a voyage from Sunderland, County Durham, United Kingdom to Genoa. She was consequently condemned.
Birkby	United Kingdom	The ship was driven ashore and wrecked at Pillau, Prussia. Her crew were rescued. She was on a voyage from Memel, Prussia to Hull, Yorkshire.
Greyhound	United States	The 583-ton screw steamer was stranded at Beaver Harbour, Nova Scotia.
James Brown	United Kingdom	The ship was abandoned in the Atlantic Ocean in a sinking condition. Her crew were rescued.
John Royle	United Kingdom	The ship was holed by her anchor at Wivenhoe, Essex and became severely leaky. She was repaired.
Marianna	United Kingdom	The 1,000-ton full-rigged ship, sailing in ballast from London to Savannah, Georgia, United States was nearing the end of her voyage when she was driven onto Tybee Bar off the coast of Georgia during a storm. The brig Rush (Flag unknown) rescued her crew.
Mary Ann	United Kingdom	The lugger collided with the schooner Tidy (United Kingdom) and sank in the River Yare.
Twilight	United States	The 644-ton screw steamer was stranded in the Cape Fear River in North Carolina.

== 15 November ==
List of shipwrecks: 15 November 1865
Ship	State	Description
Adelaide	United Kingdom	The sloop was driven ashore and wrecked in Freswick Bay. Her crew were rescued. She was on a voyage from South Shields, County Durham to Thurso, Caithness.
Citizen	(United Kingdom of Great Britain and Ireland) Bahamas	The schooner sprang a leak and sank off the Dry Tortugas. Her crew were rescued. She was on a voyage from Havana, Cuba to New Orleans, Louisiana.
Danmark	Danzig	The ship collided with the tug Rattler in the River Mersey. She was on a voyage from Danzig to Liverpool, Lancashire, United Kingdom. She was towed in to Liverpool in a sinking condition.
Glide No. 3	United States	The 225-ton sternwheel paddle steamer exploded at Madame Roubleau's Plantation near Shreveport, Louisiana.
Jane Anna	United Kingdom	The ship ran aground in Yokohama Bay and was damaged. She was on a voyager from Shanghai, China to Yokohama, Japan.
Maranoa	United Kingdom	The ship caught fire in the Indian Ocean and was abandoned by her 31 crew. They took to the boats and were rescued on 22 November by the steamship Malta (United Kingdom). Maranoa was on a voyage from Bombay, India to Aden.
Witch of the Wave	United Kingdom	The ship departed from Cardiff, Glamorgan for Buenos Aires, Argentina. No further trace, presumed foundered with the loss of all hands.

== 16 November ==
List of shipwrecks: 16 November 1865
Ship	State	Description
Ben Stickney	United States	The 889-ton sidewheel paddle steamer struck a snag and sank at Island Number Eighteen in the Mississippi River.
Capitola	United States	The 137-ton sidewheel paddle steamer struck a snag and sank at Shreveport, Louisiana.
Glencoe	United Kingdom	The barque was driven ashore and wrecked 9 nautical miles (17 km) from Libau, Courland Governorate. Her crew were rescued. She was on a voyage from Riga, Russia to Dundee, Forfarshire.
Token	(United Kingdom of Great Britain and Ireland) Jersey	The schooner was dirven ashore at Whitburn, County Durham. Her crew were rescued by the Whitburn Lifeboat. She was on a voyage form Amsterdam, North Holland, to the River Tyne.
Uncle Joe	United Kingdom	The ship foundered in the Atlantic Ocean. She was on a voyage from Navassa Island to Queenstown, County Cork.

== 17 November ==
List of shipwrecks: 17 November 1865
Ship	State	Description
Don Leandro	Flag unknown	The 86-ton two-masted lumber schooner was wrecked at Little River, California, United States. She was refloated, repaired, and returned to service.
Espho Sone Jeane	France	The ship was driven ashore in the Belfast Lough. She was on a voyage from Nantes, Loire-Inférieure to Belfast, County Antrim, United Kingdom. She was refloated and taken in to Belfast.
Golden State	Flag unknown	The schooner sank at her moorings in Mendocino Bay on the coast of California during a storm.
Helen	United States	The 65- or 121-ton two-masted schooner went aground at Point Arena, California.
J. R. Whiting, or J. R. Whitney)	Flag unknown	The schooner and her crew of seven men were lost without trace while tied up on the coast of Mendocino County, either at Kents Point or in Noyo Harbor.
Kadie	(United Kingdom of Great Britain and Ireland) Cape Colony	The steamship was wrecked at the mouth of the Breede River. Her crew were rescued. She was on a voyage from Cape Town to Port Beaufort.
Maria	United Kingdom	The ship collided with Orpheus (Bremen) and sank off Dover, Kent with the loss of all but her captain. Her was rescued by Orpheus. Maria was on a voyage from Rouen, Seine-Inférieure, France to Hull, Yorkshire.
Metis	Flag unknown	The schooner was wrecked in a gale at Casper, California.
Phoebe Fay	Flag unknown	The schooner was wrecked at Little River, California. She later was salvaged.
Sister	United Kingdom	The ship was driven ashore and wrecked at Ballywalter, County Down.
Storm Cloud	Flag unknown	Carrying a cargo of lumber, the 118-ton schooner was lost at her mooring at Mendocino, California, during a storm.
W. A. Moffitt	United States	The 553-ton sidewheel paddle steamer burned on the Mississippi River at St. Louis, Missouri.

== 18 November ==
List of shipwrecks: 18 November 1865
Ship	State	Description
Harvest Queen, and London	United Kingdom	The steamships collided in the Firth of Tay off Monifieth, Forfarshire and both sank. The collier Harvest Queen was on a voyage from to Newcastle upon Tyne, Northumberland to Dundee, Forfarshire. Sixteen of those on board took to a boat and reached shore. Harvest Queen ran aground on the Newcombe Bank. Some of those on board were rescued by the steamship Earl Grey (United Kingdom). Harvest Queen subsequently sank, her remaining crew taking to a boat and landed on the south shore of the firth. She was refloated on 30 May 1866 and taken in to Dundee. London was on a voyage from Dundee to London. All on board got on board Harvest Queen but subsequently some passengers and crew returned to London, which then heeled over and sank. Those on board were rescued by a boat from Harvest Queen and a fishing boat from Broughty Ferry. The boats were towed in to Broughty Ferry by the steamship Courier (United Kingdom). She was refloated on 15 December 1866 and towed in to Dundee by the tugs Atlas and Sampson (both United Kingdom).
John Wesley	United Kingdom	The missionary ship, a brig, was wrecked on a reef in the Friendly Islands. All on board were rescued.
Lamont	United Kingdom	The ship was driven on to the Siemont Reef in a derelict condition. She was refloated on 20 November with the assistance of three steamships and was beached at Lisbon, Portugal.
Manilla	United Kingdom	The ship departed from Calcutta for Bombay, India. No further trace, presumed foundered with the loss of all hands.
Messenger	United Kingdom	The schooner ran aground and was damaged at Newport, Monmouthshire. She was on a voyage from Newport to Southampton, Hampshire. She was refloated the next day.

== 19 November ==
List of shipwrecks: 19 November 1865
Ship	State	Description
City of Launceston	(United Kingdom) Tasmania	Illustration of City of Launceston sinking. The passenger-cargo steamer collided with the steamer Penola ( (United Kingdom of Great Britain and Ireland) South Australia) in Port Philip Bay, Victoria, and sank without loss of life. Her passengers and crew were rescued by Penola.
D. H. Blunk	United States	The 98-ton sternwheel paddle steamer struck a snag and sank at Brown's Landing, Louisiana.
Eliza Steward	United Kingdom	The barque was driven ashore at Ningpo, China.
Fannie Lehr	United States	The 306- or 435-ton sidewheel paddle steamer was beached in a sinking condition on the shore of the Savannah River 5 nautical miles (9.3 km) upstream of Purrysburg, South Carolina, after striking a snag. She later was raised.
Heatherbell	United Kingdom	The full-rigged ship foundered. Her crew were rescued by an American ship.
Merrye England	United Kingdom	The ship ran aground in the Hooghly River. She was on a voyage from Calcutta, India to London. She had been refloated by 8 December and had resumed her voyage.
Nerbudda	United Kingdom	The steamship was sighted on 19 November in the Atlantic Ocean at 50°N 9°W, apparently in distress, whilst on a voyage from Liverpool, Lancashire to Bombay, India. As no further trace found, she is presumed foundered with the loss of all hands, about 50 lives.

== 20 November ==
List of shipwrecks: 20 November 1865
Ship	State	Description
Actæa	United Kingdom	The ship ran aground at Port Natal, Cape Colony and was damaged. She was on a voyage from Port Natal to London. She was refloated on 2 December.
Black Diamond	United Kingdom	The schooner was driven ashore and wrecked at Bridport, Dorset. Her crew were rescued. She was on a voyage from Cork to Bridport.
Dolphin	United Kingdom	The tug ran aground at Great Yarmouth, Norfolk.
Ethelreda	United Kingdom	The barque was wrecked at "Martha", Cape Colony. Her crew were rescued. She was on a voyage from Samarang, Netherlands East Indies to Falmouth, Cornwall.
Jeane Aline	France	The schooner was abandoned 30 nautical miles (56 km) off Ouessant, Finistère. Her crew were rescued. She was on a voyage from Portugal to the Clyde.
Loch Lamar	United Kingdom	The ship was driven ashore near Fort Trumbull, Connecticut, United States. She was on a voyage from North Shields, Northumberland to New London, Connecticut. She was later refloated and taken in to New London.
Niagara	United States	The 797-ton sidewheel paddle steamer sank in the Mississippi River at the mouth of the St. Francis River upstream of Helena, Arkansas, with the loss of 75 lives after colliding with Post Boy (Flag unknown).
Panama	United Kingdom	The brig sank at Nassau, Bahamas.
Princess Royal	United Kingdom	The ship departed from Liverpool, Lancashire for Halifax, Nova Scotia, British North America. No further trace, presumed foundered with the loss of all hands.
Thomas Durham	United States	The full-rigged ship was driven ashore on Long Island, New York. She was on a voyage from London, United Kingdom to New York City.

== 21 November ==
List of shipwrecks: 21 November 1865
Ship	State	Description
Corveno	Italy	The barque was wrecked on Cape Engaño, Dominican Republic. She was on a voyage from Liverpool, Lancashire, United Kingdom to Matamoros, Mexico.
Lilian	United Kingdom	The ship ran aground on the Coron Grande and was wrecked. Her crew were rescued. She was on a voyage from Cardiff, Glamorgan to Maranhão, Brazil.
Londesborough	United Kingdom	The brig was driven ashore at Swansea, Glamorgan. She was refloated on 2 December and taken in to Swansea.
Maragret	United Kingdom	The ship was driven ashore at Swansea. She was refloated on 2 December and taken in to Swansea.

== 22 November ==
List of shipwrecks: 22 November 1865
Ship	State	Description
Acastus	United Kingdom	The ship ran aground at Falmouth, Cornwall. She was on a voyage from Constanţa, Ottoman Empire to Falmouth. She was refloated.
Active	United Kingdom	The schooner was driven ashore at "Gellynick", Pembrokeshire. She was consequently condemned.
Amoor	United Kingdom	The ship was driven ashore in the Cattewater. Her 435 passengers were landed. She was on a voyage from Plymouth, Devon to Adelaide, South Australia.
Ann Elizabeth	United Kingdom	The ship was driven ashore at Milford Haven, Pembrokeshire. She was on a voyage from Newport, Monmouthshire to Cork. She was refloated on 1 December.
Apollo	United Kingdom	The schooner was driven ashore and scuttled in Batten Bay, Devon. She was on a voyage from Swansea, Glamorgan to Plymouth.
Argo	Portugal	The barque was abandoned off the Tusker Rock, in the Bristol Channel. Her crew survived. Argo was on a voyage from Faial Island, Azores to Liverpool, Lancashire, United Kingdom. She was later retrieved by the Porthcawl Lifeboat and towed in to Porthcawl, Glamorgan in a derelict condition.
Ariel	United Kingdom	The barque foundered 30 nautical miles (56 km) off Queenstown, County Cork. Her crew were rescued by the brig Elizabeth Jane (United Kingdom). Ariel was on a voyage from Odesa, Russia to Queenstown.
Bremen	Bremen	The ship was driven ashore at Quebec City, Province of Canada, British North America. She was on a voyage from Quebec City to Cardiff, Glamorgan.
Charles	United Kingdom	The schooner was driven ashore at Plymouth.
Claudine	United Kingdom	The ship was driven ashore at Aberavon, Glamorgan.
Constance	United Kingdom	The barque was driven ashore and wrecked at South Shields, County Durham with the loss of four of her crew.
Dashaway	United Kingdom	The ship departed from Charlottetown, Prince Edward Island, British North America for Liverpool. No further trace, presumed foundered with the loss of all hands.
Emanuel	France	The brig was driven ashore and wrecked at Portland, Dorset, United Kingdom. She was on a voyage from Rouen, Seine-Inférieure to Ferrol, Spain.
Espoir	Belgium	The schooner was driven ashore in Batten Bay. She was on a voyage from the Rio Grande to Plymouth. She was refloated that day and placed under repair.
Ezra	United Kingdom	The schooner was driven against the quayside and sank at Plymouth. Her crew were rescued.
Faulista	France	The full-rigged ship was driven ashore in Batten Bay. She was on a voyage from Havre de Grâce, Seine-Inférieure to Rio de Janeiro, Brazil.
Hero	United Kingdom	The ship was driven ashore at Dartmouth, Devon. She was on a voyage from Constanţa, Ottoman Empire to Liverpool, Lancashire.
Hindoo	United Kingdom	The brig was driven ashore at Plymouth. She was later refloated.
Jacksons	United States	The steam lighter sank in Mobile Bay.
Jehedehoy Family	India	The ship was driven ashore at Dartmouth. She was on a voyage from Calcutta to London.
Jules II	Sweden	The brig was driven ashore at Plymouth.
Karen	Denmark	The ship was driven ashore near "Hausvig", 4 nautical miles (7.4 km) from Ringkøbing.
Loyer	United Kingdom	The ship was driven ashore at Plymouth. She was on a voyage from Havre de Grâce to the Rio Grande.
Maria Jane	United Kingdom	The schooner was driven ashore at Plymouth. She was on a voyage from Cardiff to Caen, Calvados.
Mary	United Kingdom	The ship was driven ashore at Plymouth. She was on a voyage from Cardiff to Dieppe, Seine-Inférieure.
Mary Hill	United States	The 234-ton sidewheel paddle steamer struck a snag and sank in the Trinity River in Texas.
Max Emil	Rostock	The ship was driven ashore on Skagen, Denmark. She was on a voyage from Newcastle upon Tyne, Northumberland, United Kingdom to Lübeck. She was refloated and resumed her voyage.
Mischief	United Kingdom	The brigantine was wrecked at Plymouth.
Nell	United Kingdom	The ship was driven ashore at Milford Haven. She was on a voyage from Llanelly, Glamorgan to Newry, County Antrim. She was refloated and taken in to Milford Haven, where she was repaired.
Pride of the Dart	United Kingdom	The smack was driven ashore and wrecked at Dartmouth.
Rhedertenden	Norway	The brig was washed out of the harbour at St Michael's Mount and wrecked at Marazion, Cornwall.
Six	United Kingdom	The ship was wrecked near Kristianstad, Denmark. Her crew were rescued. She was on a voyage from Kronstadt, Russia to London.
Spring	United Kingdom	The smack was driven ashore and severely damaged at Padstow, Cornwall.
St. Germans	United Kingdom	The schooner was driven ashore and wrecked at Queen Anne's Point, Devon.
Thoracever	United Kingdom	The ship ran aground at "Blaisbank". She was on a voyage from Quebec City to Liverpool, Lancashire. She was refloated.
Triton	United Kingdom	The schooner was driven ashore at Pwllheli, Caernarfonshire. Her crew were rescued.
Veritas	(United Kingdom of Great Britain and Ireland) Guernsey	The schooner was run into, and damaged by, Amoor (United Kingdom) at Plymouth. She was placed under repair.
Victoria	United Kingdom	The schooner was driven ashore in Batten Bay. She was on a voyage from London to Saint John's, Newfoundland, British North America, or from Figueira da Foz, Portugal to Labrador, British North America. She subsequently became a wreck.
Volante	United Kingdom	The schooner was driven ashore and severely damaged at Cardiff, Glamorgan.
Westoe	United Kingdom	The barque departed from Constantinople, Ottoman Empire for Falmouth. No further trace, presumed foundered with the loss of all hands.

== 23 November ==
List of shipwrecks: 23 November 1865
Ship	State	Description
Adam Lodge	United Kingdom	The barque was driven ashore at St Just in Roseland, Cornwall. She was on a voyage from South Shields, County Durham to Naples, Italy. She was refloated on 5 December.
Adele	United Kingdom	During a gale the schooner drifted out of the harbour at St Michael's Mount and was driven onto the beach at Marazion, Cornwall. She was carrying china clay from Charlestown, to Runcorn, Cheshire.
Adele	United Kingdom	The barque was driven ashore near Penzance, Cornwall.
Annandale	United Kingdom	The ship ran aground on the Couch Reef. She was on a voyage from New Orleans, Louisiana, United States to Liverpool, Lancashire. She was refloated on 27 November and taken in to Key West, Florida, United States, where she was condemned.
Constance	France	The lugger was carrying barley from Saint-Malo, Ille-et-Vilaine, to Cardiff, Glamorgan, United Kingdom, when she was driven ashore two miles west of Polperro, Cornwall. The master and boy were saved and two crew were drowned.
Emmanuel and Adrien	France	The smack was driven ashore at Llanmadoc, Glamorgan. She was on a voyage from Pont-l'Abbe, Finistère to Swansea, Glamorgan. She was refloated on 19 December and towed in to Llanelly, Glamorgan.
Fatfield	United Kingdom	The steamship ran aground in the River Wear.
Favourite	United Kingdom	The brig was driven ashore and wrecked at Blackpool, Lancashire with the loss of all ten crew. She was on a voyage from the Sherbro River, Sierra Leone to Liverpool, Lancashire.
Hawthorn	United Kingdom	The brig ran aground in the River Wear.
Idalin	United Kingdom	The ship foundered in the North Sea with the loss of two of her crew. She was on a voyage from Wismar to London.
Orpheus	United Kingdom	The ship depareted from Newcastle upon Tyne, Northumberland for Alexandria, Egypt. No further trace, presumed foundered with the loss of all hands.
Pride of Wales	United Kingdom	The full-rigged ship was driven ashore and severely damaged at Aberavon, Glamorgan. She was on a voyage from Swansea, Glamorgan to New Orleans, Louisiana. Pride of Wales was refloated on 2 December and taken in to Briton Ferry, Glamorgan.
Rebecca	United Kingdom	The barque was driven ashore at Whitburn, County Durham. She was refloated the next day and taken in to North Shields, [Northumberland.
Richard and Henry	United Kingdom	The crewless ship was driven out to sea from Pwllheli, Caernarfonshire. No further trace, presumed foundered.
Verona	United Kingdom	The steamship was driven ashore at Rønne, Denmark. She was on a voyage from Danzig to Hull, Yorkshire. She was refloated on 29 November and towed in to Copenhagen, Denmark in a leaky condition.
White Squall	United Kingdom	The barque was driven ashore near Swansea, Glamorgan. Her crew were rescued. She was on a voyage from Coquimbo, Chile to Swansea. She was refloated on 29 November and taken in to Swansea.
Unnamed	Brazil	The barque was driven ashore and wrecked in Mount Bay with the loss of sixteen of her crew.
Unnamed	United Kingdom	The steamship was driven ashore on Bornholm, Denmark.

== 24 November ==
List of shipwrecks: 24 November 1865
Ship	State	Description
Annie Lee	United Kingdom	The crew of the barque were saved when she sank after dragging her anchors and fouling the chains of the barque Emilie Barbame (Italy) outside the Black Rock, Cornwall. She was sailing from Taganrog, Russia, with a cargo of wheat.
Don Baltazar	United Kingdom	The ship was destroyed by fire in the Pacific Ocean off the coast of Chile. Her crew were rescued by Annapolis (United States). Don Baltazar was on a voyage from Swansea, Glamorgan to Valparaíso, Chile.
Drydens	United Kingdom	The barque was wrecked at Par, Cornwall. Thirteen crew were rescued by the Fowey Lifeboat Catherine Rashleigh ( Royal National Lifeboat Institution). Drydens was on a voyage from Sulina, Ottoman Empire to Falmouth, Cornwall.
Eliza	United Kingdom	The schooner was driven against the quayside at Plymouth, Devon and sank. Her crew were rescued.
Gelert	United Kingdom	The ship sank off Douglas, Isle of Man. Her crew were rescued. She was on a voyage from Caernarfon to Coleraine, County Antrim.
Hattie Morrison	United States	The schooner was abandoned in the Atlantic Ocean with the loss of a crew member. She was on a voyage from Liverpool, Lancashire, United Kingdom to Philadelphia, Pennsylvania.
Johan II	Sweden	The brig was damaged in a gale at Plymouth. She was condemned.
La Marie	France	The schooner was damaged in a gale at Plymouth. She was refloated and placed under repair.
Minerva	United States	The cargo schooner was lost near Pictou, Nova Scotia. Crew saved.
Palestine	United Kingdom	The ship was damaged by fire at London.
Pauliste	France	The full-rigged ship was driven ashore at Plymouth.
Santisto	Brazil	The barque was wrecked at Gunwalloe, Cornwall with the loss of sixteen of her eighteen crew. She was on a voyage from Brazil to Havre de Grâce, Seine-Inférieure, France.
Spagna	Italy	The brig, carrying wheat from Taganrog, to Falmouth, was embayed in south-southwesterly hurricane-force winds and wrecked under Perran Cliff in Mount's Bay.
Teste	United Kingdom	The schooner was driven ashore at Whitburn, County Durham. Her six crew were rescued by the Whitburn Lifeboat. She was on a voyage from Southampton, Hampshire to the River Tyne. She was refloated the next day with the assistance of three tugs and was beached.
Tobaco, or Tobacofrontera	Prussia	All but one member of the seven crew of the brigantine were saved by a rocket apparatus and the lifeboat Richard Lewis ( Royal National Lifeboat Institution) at Long Rock, Mount's Bay. She was carrying logs from Tabasco, Mexico to Hamburg.
Wanderer	United States	The 36-ton sidewheel paddle steamer was stranded on the Mississippi River at Gretna, Louisiana.
Wearmouth	United Kingdom	The brig was wrecked at Par. Her ten crew were rescued by the Fowey Lifeboat Catherine Rashleigh ( Royal National Lifeboat Institution). Wearmouth was on a voyage from Taganrog to Falmouth.
William	United Kingdom	The 325-ton Sunderland barque was carrying linseed from Odesa, Russia, to Falmouth, when she had to run for shelter at Porthleven, Cornwall. The ship came to rest with her stern overhanging the quay and road, and all bar two of the crew climbed to safety.

== 25 November ==
List of shipwrecks: 25 November 1865
Ship	State	Description
Ayrshire	United Kingdom	The paddle tug heeled over and sank at Sunderland, County Durham.
Brigetta Melchiors	Denmark	The brig was driven ashore in the Cattewater.
Clorinda	Italy	The barque was wrecked near Sidmouth, Devon, United Kingdom, Her crew survived. She was on a voyage from Nicolaieff, Russia to Falmouth, Cornwall, United Kingdom.
Commerce	United Kingdom	The brig departed from Glasgow, Renfrewshire for Dundalk, County Louth. No further trace, presumed foundered with the loss of all hands.
Commerzieweathin Haupt	Grand Duchy of Oldenburg	The brig ran aground in the Cattewater and was wrecked. Her eleven crew were rescued by the lifeboat Prince Consort ( Royal National Lifeboat Institution) and the tug Napoleon (United Kingdom). She was refloated on 18 December and taken in to Plymouth, Devon.
Dove	(United Kingdom of Great Britain and Ireland) British North America	The schooner was driven ashore at Richibucto, New Brunswick. She was on a voyage from Shediac, Nova Scotia to Chatham, New Brunswick.
Effort	United Kingdom	The ship was driven ashore on "Ruckholz". She was on a voyage from Saint Petersburg, Russia to Aberdeen. She was refloated.
Great Britain	United Kingdom	The ship was driven out to sea from Madras, India. No further trace, presumed foundered with the loss of all hands.
Isabella	United Kingdom	The schooner was driven ashore and wrecked near Waterford. She was on a voyage from Waterford to Cardiff, Glamorgan.
Mayflower	United Kingdom	The schooner was driven ashore and sank east of Point Lynas, Anglesey. She was on a voyage from Par, Cornwall to Runcorn, Cheshire.
Nellie Pentz	United States	The 409-ton sidewheel paddle steamer foundered in Lynnhaven Bay on the coast of Virginia.
Rebecca, or Rebekah	United Kingdom	The ship was driven ashore and wrecked near Ramsey, Isle of Man. Her crew survived. She was on a voyage from Garston, Lancashire to Newry, County Antrim.
Shamrock	United Kingdom	The ship was wrecked off the Rabbit Islands, Sutherland. She was on a voyage from Thurso to Tongue.
Sophia Ann	United Kingdom	The ship was driven ashore at Swansea, Glamorgan. She was on a voyage from Cardiff, Glamorgan to Alicante, Spain.

== 26 November ==
List of shipwrecks: 26 November 1865
Ship	State	Description
Amazone	Stralsund	The ship was lost off Lemvig, Denmark with the loss of her captain. She was on a voyage from Middlesbrough, North Riding of Yorkshire, United Kingdom to Wolgast, Prussia.
Elpis	United Kingdom	The brig was wrecked on Nash Combe, in the Bristol Channel off the coast of Glamorgan with the loss of nine of her eleven crew.
Envoy	United Kingdom	The schooner was abandoned in the North Sea. Her crew were rescued by Fortitude (United Kingdom). She was towed in to North Shields on 30 December by the tug Olive Branch (United Kingdom).
Leopold and Sidonie	France	The schooner sprang a leak and foundered in the Mediterranean Sea off "Gasaba", Egypt. Her crew were rescued. She was on a voyage from Rosetta to Alexandria.
HMS Linnet	Royal Navy	The Britomart-class gunboat was driven ashore. Subsequently refloated, repaired and returned to service.
Mary	United Kingdom	The Mersey Flat collided with the tug Resolute (United Kingdom) in the River Mersey and was abandoned. Her crew were rescued by Resolute. Mary was subsequently towed in to Liverpool.
Osprey	United Kingdom	The sloop was wrecked near Buckie, Moray with the loss of all three crew.

== 27 November ==
List of shipwrecks: 27 November 1865
Ship	State	Description
Bravo	United Kingdom	The ship departed from Quebec City, Province of Canada, British North America for Liverpool, Lancashire. No further trace, presumed foundered with the loss of all hands.
Catherine Leed	United Kingdom	The schooner ran aground on the Holm Sand, in the North Sea on the coast of Suffolk. She was refloated and taken in to Corton, Suffolk.
Copernicus	Hamburg	The ship departed from New York, United States for Liverpool, Lancashire, United Kingdom. No further trace, presumed foundered with the loss of all hands.
Enterprise	United Kingdom	The ship was driven ashore at Beaumaris, Anglesey. She was on a voyage from Liverpool to Tampico, Mexico. She was refloated with assistance.
Fairlie	United Kingdom	The ship was abandoned in the Indian Ocean. Her crew were rescued by Innisfallen (United Kingdom). Fairlie was on a voyage from Calcutta, India to London.
Gazelle	United Kingdom	The ship was wrecked on the Niding Reef, in the Baltic Sea. Her crew were rescued. She was on a voyage from an English port to Stettin.
Jupiter	United Kingdom	The full-rigged ship ran aground and was wrecked on Cayo Romano. She was on a voyage from Liverpool to Havana, Cuba.
Lydia Jane	United Kingdom	The brig ran aground at Sunderland, County Durham. She was refloated and towed in to Sunderland.
Minerva	United Kingdom	The schooner was driven ashore and wrecked near Pictou, Nova Scotia, British North America. She was on a voyage from Prince Edward Island, British North America to Gloucester.
Rebecca	United Kingdom	The full-rigged ship sprang a leak was beached on Föhr, Duchy of Holstein. She broke up on 30 November and was abandoned by her crew.

== 28 November ==
List of shipwrecks: 28 November 1865
Ship	State	Description
Carmen	Spain	The barque was wrecked on the Macarus Reef. She was on a voyage from London, United Kingdom to Havana, Cuba.
Lively	United Kingdom	The ship ran aground on the Herd Sand, in the North Sea off the coast of County Durham. She was refloated and towed in to North Shields, Northumberland.
Prince Albert	United Kingdom	The brig was driven ashore and wrecked between the North Foreland and Margate, Kent. Her crew were rescued. She was on a voyage from Sunderland, County Durham to Le Tréport, Seine-Inférieure.
Simonds or Simons	United Kingdom	The full-rigged ship was driven ashore on Body Island, North Carolina. She was on a voyage from Liverpool to Baltimore with salt.
Susan	United Kingdom	The dandy, carrying creosote, became stranded and was lost in a force 8 northerly gale 8 nautical miles (15 km) off Trevose Head, Cornwall, with the loss of three of her four crew. She was on a voyage from Gloucester to St. Ives, Cornwall.

== 29 November ==
List of shipwrecks: 29 November 1865
Ship	State	Description
Courier	United Kingdom	The ship departed from Quebec City, Province of Canada, British North America for Sunderland, County Durham. No further trace, presumed foundered with the loss of all hands.
Dart	(United Kingdom of Great Britain and Ireland) Jersey	The ship was towed in to Plymouth, Devon in a derelict condition.
Henriette	Kingdom of Hanover	The ship ran aground at Husum, Duchy of Holstein. She was on a voyage from Wöhrden, Duchy of Schleswig to Leith, Lothian, United Kingdom.
Julia	United Kingdom	The ship departed from Paimbœuf, Loire-Inférieure, France for Liverpool, Lancashire. No further trace, presumed foundered with the loss of all hands.
Kate	United Kingdom	The ship collided with Odessa Packet (United Kingdom) and sank off Great Yarmouth, Norfolk. Her crew were rescued by Alexander Cochrane (United Kingdom). Kate was on a voyage from Sunderland to Caen, Calvados, France.
Saybrook	United States	The ship departed from New York for Liverpool. No further trace, presumed foundered with the loss of all hands.
Victoria	United States	The 23-ton sternwheel paddle steamer was lost at New Orleans, Louisiana.
Victoria	United Kingdom	The brig was driven ashore and wrecked in Lynnhaven Bay, United States. She was on a voyage from Liverpool to Richmond, Virginia. Her cargo of salt and liquor was salved and she was later floated and taken to Norfolk, Virginia for repairs

== 30 November ==
List of shipwrecks: 30 November 1865
Ship	State	Description
Colubine	United Kingdom	The ship ran aground at South Shields, County Durham. She was on a voyage from a Spanish port to South Shields.
Merton	(United Kingdom of Great Britain and Ireland) British North America	The schooner ran aground on the Devil's Bank. She was refloated and beached on Sorrell's Island, Massachusetts, United States.
Ocean Bride	United Kingdom	The ship was discovered abandoned in the English Channel off Beachy Head, Sussex. She was on a voyage from Viviers, France to London. She was towed in to Newhaven, Sussex.
Port	United Kingdom	The schooner collided with a steamship and sank in the River Mersey.

== Unknown date ==
List of shipwrecks: Unknown date 1865
Ship	State	Description
Alma	United Kingdom	The ship was driven ashore east of Cardiff, Glamorgan.
Ann	United Kingdom	The schooner was driven ashore and wrecked at Dungeness, Kent. She was on a voyage from Newcastle upon Tyne, Northumberland to Truro, Cornwall.
Antwerp	United Kingdom	The steamship was wrecked at Matanzas, Cuba.
Arabia	United Kingdom	The steamship was driven ashore at Cocanada, India.
Arica	Spain	The ship was driven ashore at Plymouth, Devon, United Kingdom.
Assiduous	United Kingdom	The brig collided with another vessel and sank in the River Thames at New Deptford, Kent with some loss of life. There were five survivors.
Berkeley	United Kingdom	The ship was driven ashore and wrecked at Pillau, Prussia.
Black Diamond	United Kingdom	The ship was driven ashore and wrecked at Bridport, Dorset.
Blanche	United Kingdom	The ship was lost off the mouth of the Rio Bento before 5 November. Her crew were rescued. She was on a voyage from Liverpool to the Rio Bento.
Brookeness	United Kingdom	The ship was driven ashore and wrecked at Berck, Pas-de-Calais, France. She was on a voyage from Bordeaux, Gironde, France to Sunderland, County Durham.
Cairnsfoot	United Kingdom	The brig was driven ashore and wrecked at St. George's, Newfoundland, British North America. She was on a voyage from Quebec City, Province of Canada, British North America to Westport, County Mayo.
Caroline Nesmith	United Kingdom	The ship was wrecked on the French Reef, 40 nautical miles (74 km) off the coast of Florida, United States. Her crew were rescued. She was on a voyage from New Orleans, Louisiana, United States to Liverpool, Lancashire.
Casimir Castro	United States Army	The 128-ton screw steamer sank at the Brazos Bar on the coast of Texas. She later was refloated.
Castor	United Kingdom	The ship foundered in the Indian Ocean before 27 November. Her crew were rescued.
Ceres	United Kingdom	The ship sank in Swansea Bay.
Chillianwallah	United Kingdom	The full-rigged ship was driven ashore on "Bier Island" before 14 November. She was on a voyage from Quebec City to Cork. She was refloated and put back to Quebec City, where she arrived on 22 November.
Coerno	Italy	The barque was wrecked on Cape Engaño, Dominican Republic. She was on a voyage from Liverpool to Matamoros, Mexico.
Constance	United Kingdom	The ship was driven ashore at Vindava, Courland Governorate with the loss of three of her crew.
Constance	United Kingdom	The ship was wrecked in Sandwich Bay, Kent. She was on a voyage from Saint-Malo, Ille-et-Vilaine, France to Cardiff.
Daniel	United Kingdom	The barque caught fire at Halifax, Nova Scotia, British North America and was scuttled after 10 November. She was on a voyage from Matamoras to Liverpool. She was refloated on 12 December.
Duke W. Goodman	United States	The 196-ton sternwheel steamer burned at Rainwater, Alabama.
Eduard	Russia	The brig was abandoned in the Atlantic Ocean before 24 November. Her twelve crew were rescued two days later by a Bremen ship. She was on a voyage from Bilbao, Spain to Riga.
Eureka	United Kingdom	The ship was wrecked on the Great Sand Cay. She was on a voyage from Halifax, Nova Scotia, British North America to Puerto Rico.
Forningen	Norway	The barque was driven ashore at Brielle, South Holland, Netherlands. Her crew were rescued by the steamship Avalon (United Kingdom).
Freedom	United Kingdom	The barque ran aground on the Englishman's Shoal, in the Bosphorus. She was on a voyage from Odesa, Russia to an English port. She was refloated and taken in to Constantinople, Ottoman Empire, where she arrived on 17 November.
Gellert	United Kingdom	The ship departed from Philadelphia, Pennsylvania, United States in early November. No further trace, presumed foundered with the loss of all hands.
Gezina Hendrika	Netherlands	The schooner sank at Brăila, Ottoman Empire between 12 and 23 November.
Grasshopper	United Kingdom	The schooner was driven ashore at Lowestoft, Suffolk. She was refloated and assisted in to Lowestoft in a leaky condition.
Hanover	United Kingdom	The schooner was wrecked on the coast of Florida, United States.
Harry of the West	United States	The 1,050-ton clipper burned in Louisiana near the mouth of the Mississippi River before 21 November. Her crew were rescued by Ella (United Kingdom). Harry of the West was on a voyage from New Orleans, Louisiana to Liverpool.
Hendrick Wergeland	Flag unknown	The ship was abandoned off the Irish coast. Her crew were rescued by Sostrene (Flag unknown).
Hengist	Bremen	The barque was abandoned in the Atlantic Ocean with some loss of life. Survivors were rescued by Irvine (United Kingdom).
Hennette	France	The ship was lost whilst on a voyage from Bordeaux to New Orleans.
Henry	United Kingdom	The schooner sank at Berwick upon Tweed, Northumberland. She was on a voyage from Bo'ness, Lothian to Berwick upon Tweed.
James and Ann	United Kingdom	The ship foundered in the North Sea. Wreckage washed up on Terschelling, Friesland, Netherlands.
James Montgomery	United Kingdom	The ship ran aground on the Scroby Sands, Norfolk. She was on a voyage from South Shields, County Durham to Alexandria, Egypt. She was refloated.
Jane and Anne	United Kingdom	The schooner was driven ashore near Dundalk, County Louth. She was on a voyage from Newport, Monmouthshire to Dublin.
Jane M. Harwood	United Kingdom	The barque was wrecked near Key West, Florida, United States. She was on a voyage from New Orleans, Louisiana, United States to Havre de Grâce, Seine-Inférieure, France.
Johannes	Flag unknown	The ship was abandoned at sea. She was on a voyage from the Rio Grande to Plymouth .
Joven Rosita	Spain	The brigantine was wrecked on Flores Island, Azores. Her crew survived. She was on a voyage from Puerto Rico to Newfoundland.
J. W. Johnston	United States	The ship was wrecked on Gran Canarai, Canary Islands.
Keppler	United Kingdom	The ship departed from Philadelphia in early November. No further trace, presumed foundered with the loss of all hands.
Leila	United Kingdom	The brig foundered off the Runnel Stone, Devon. Her crew were rescued. She was on a voyage from Cardiff to Southampton, Hampshire.
Lord Clyde	United Kingdom	The barque was driven ashore at Blakeney, Norfolk. She was on a voyage from South Shields to Alexandria. She was refloated on 29 November.
Malia	United Kingdom	The ship foundered in the North Sea before 29 November. Her seven crew were rescued.
Mar	United Kingdom	The ship was driven ashore at Swansea.
Margaret Jane	United Kingdom	The ship was wrecked near L'Orient, Morbihan, France.
Marquis of Bute	United Kingdom	The ship was driven ashore east of Cardiff.
Martha	Danzig	The ship was driven ashore on the Dutch coast. She was refloated and taken in to Brouwershaven, Zeeland, Netherlands.
Mary	United Kingdom	The smack was wrecked. A crew member was rescued by the Tenby Lifeboat.
Mary Elizabeth	United Kingdom	The ship was driven ashore at Point Escuminac, New Brunswick, British North America. She was on a voyage from Liverpool to Miramichi, New Brunswick. She was later refloated and taken in to Miramichi.
Melody	United Kingdom	The ship was lost off Minatitlan, Mexico before 5 November with the loss of five of her crew.
Mercy	United Kingdom	The ship was wrecked on a reef 20 nautical miles (37 km) off the coast of Florida. Four crew were rescued, the rest were reported missing.
Mersey	United Kingdom	The ship was driven ashore at Milford Haven. She was on a voyage from Newport, Monmouthshire to Liverpool. She was refloated on 2 December.
Mooltan	India	The ship ran aground Calcutta.
Neil	United Kingdom	The ship was driven ashore at Milford Haven.
Ormilee	United Kingdom	The ship ran aground on the Laprand Bank, in the Baltic Sea. She was on a voyage from Kronstadt, Russia to Liverpool.
Osprey	United Kingdom	The ship was driven ashore at Milford Haven. She was on a voyage from Beauly, Inverness-shire to Cardiff. She was refloated on 1 December.
Oswingo	United Kingdom	The ship was wrecked at Key West, Florida, United States. She was on a voyage from Liverpool to Havana, Cuba.
Panamia	United States	The full-rigged ship was wrecked on the coast of Florida.
Patience	United Kingdom	The sloop foundered in the North Sea 15 nautical miles (28 km) south east of Lowestoft. Her three crew were rescued by a French lugger. She was on a voyage from Ipswich, Suffolk to Goole, Yorkshire.
Percival	United Kingdom	The ship foundered in the North Sea off the Dutch coast. Wreckage washed up on Terschelling.
Pilot	United States	The 77-ton screw steamer burned at Algonac, Michigan.
Queen Mab	United Kingdom	The full-rigged ship was wrecked on the cost of Florida.
Recruit	United Kingdom	The ship foundered between Lerwick, Shetland Islands and Fair Isle after 8 November. Her six crew were rescued. She was on a voyage from Lossiemouth, Moray to Scalloway, Shetland Islands.
Resolution	United Kingdom	The schooner foundered near Land's End, Cornwall. She was on a voyage from Youghal, County Cork to Portsmouth, Hampshire.
Resolution	(United Kingdom of Great Britain and Ireland) New Zealand	The steamer was wrecked at Greymouth, when the ship was driven ashore in the Grey River estuary.
Rising Sun	United Kingdom	The ship was driven ashore at Falmouth, Cornwall. She was on a voyage from Moulmein, Burma to Falmouth.
River Wear	United Kingdom	The ship was destroyed by fire in the Pacific Ocean off the coast of Chile.
Robert Small	United Kingdom	The ship was driven ashore at Beaumont, Province of Canada. She was on a voyage from Quebec City to Cardiff.
Sarnia	United Kingdom	The barque was driven ashore at Swansea. She was on a voyage from Cork to Swansea.
Scutari	United Kingdom	The ship was wrecked at Santa Anna, in the Gulf of Mexico.
Sebah	United Kingdom	The ship was driven ashore at Amlwch, Anglesey.
Shakespeare	United Kingdom	The ship was wrecked on the White Dogs, in the South China Sea before 15 November.
Shuracaver	United Kingdom	The ship ran aground at "Blarisbank". She was on a voyage from Quebec City to Liverpool.
S. N. Charwood	United Kingdom	The ship was driven ashore at Ystad, Sweden. She was on a voyage from Kronstadt to an English port.
Southern Cross	United Kingdom	The ship sank at Calcutta.
Souvenir	United Kingdom	The ship was wrecked near Cádiz, Spain. She was on a voyage from Sunderland to Alexandria.
Splendid	United Kingdom	The fishing smack was lost off the coast of Lincolnshire. Her nine crew were rescued by the Theddlethorpe Lifeboat.
St. James	United Kingdom	The ship was wrecked. She was on a voyage from New York, United States to Queenstown, County Cork.
St. Lawrence	United States	The fishing schooner was lost near Ragged Island in early November. Crew saved.
Test	United Kingdom	The schooner was wrecked. Six crew were rescued by the Whitburn Lifeboat.
Theobald	United Kingdom	The full-rigged ship was wrecked on the coast of Florida.
Thomas	United Kingdom	The ship sank 25 nautical miles (46 km) off the west coast of Scotland in a possible case of barratry. She was on a voyage from Liverpool to Newcastle upon Tyne.
Thomas Barker	United Kingdom	The ship collided with the brig Edith Mary and sank with the loss of all hands.
Tocopilla	Chile	The barque was driven ashore near Swansea. She was on a voyage from Swansea to Chile. She was refloated on 26 November and beached at the Mumbles, Glamorgan.
Torrid Zone	United Kingdom	The ship was driven ashore. She was on a voyage from New York to Demerara, British Guiana. She was refloated and put in to Bermuda.
Velicidade	Flag unknown	The ship was driven ashore on Læsø, Denmark. She was on a voyage from Saint Petersburg, Russia to London, United Kingdom.
Vigilant	United Kingdom	The ship was driven ashore in the Isles of Scilly.
Waterloo	United Kingdom	The ship was driven ashore at Milford Haven.
Wilhelmina	United Kingdom	The ship was driven ashore at Milford Haven.
William	United Kingdom	The ship was driven ashore in the Gulf of Finland. She was on a voyage from Kronstadt to Newcastle upon Tyne. She was refloated and resumed her voyage, but put in to Helsingør, Denmark in a leaky condition and was repaired there.
William	United Kingdom	The ship was driven ashore at Porthcawen, Cornwall. She was on a voyage from Odesa, Russia to Falmouth. She became a wreck in early December.
William Yeo	United Kingdom	The ship was driven ashore east of Cardiff.
