= List of rogue waves incidents =

Incidents of known and likely rogue waves

The Draupner wave, a single giant wave measured on New Year's Day 1995, finally confirmed the existence of freak waves, which had previously been considered near-mythical.

This list of rogue waves compiles incidents of known and likely rogue waves – also known as freak waves, monster waves, killer waves, and extreme waves. These are dangerous and rare ocean surface waves that unexpectedly reach at least twice the height of the tallest waves around them and are often described by witnesses as "walls of water". They occur in deep water, usually far out at sea, and are a threat even to capital ships, ocean liners and land structures such as lighthouses.

== Background ==
Anecdotal evidence from mariners' testimonies and incidents of wave damage to ships has long suggested the existence of rogue waves; however, their scientific measurement was positively confirmed only following measurements of the Draupner wave, a rogue wave at the Draupner platform, in the North Sea on 1 January 1995. In this event, minor damage was inflicted on the platform, confirming that the reading was valid.

In modern oceanography, rogue waves are defined not as the biggest possible waves at sea, but instead as extreme-sized waves for a given sea state. Extremely large waves offer an explanation for the otherwise inexplicable disappearance of many ocean-going vessels. However, the claim is contradicted by information held by Lloyd's Register. One of the very few cases where evidence suggests a freak wave incident is the 1978 loss of the freighter MS München. This claim, however, is contradicted by other sources, which maintain that, over a time period from 1969 to 1994 alone, rogue waves were responsible for the complete loss of 22 supertankers, often with their entire crew. In 2007, researcher Paul C. Liu of NOAA compiled a list of more than 50 incidents likely associated with rogue waves. Some have suggested that, using commercially available data, a large ship completely disappears without a trace once every two years. The cause is never determined.

== Known or suspected rogue wave incidents ==
In addition to the incidents listed below, it has also been suggested that these types of waves may be responsible for the loss of several low-flying United States Coast Guard helicopters on search and rescue missions.

=== Before 1950 ===
- On 4 August 1498, during the third voyage of Christopher Columbus, Columbus's ships were in the Gulf of Paria off the southern tip of Trinidad when Columbus heard a tremendous roar from behind his flagship. He observed a wave approaching from astern that was as tall as his ships' masts. Columbus described the wave as lifting his ships higher than anything he ever had experienced before, after which the ships dropped into a huge trough.
- On 28 September 1853 a huge wave struck the emigrant ship Annie Jane while she was off Barra in the Outer Hebrides. The wave caused the poop deck to collapse, instantly crushing 200 people to death. Annie Jane soon sank, and her 102 survivors were washed ashore on a piece of her deck.
- On 11 March 1861 at midday, the lighthouse on Eagle Island off the west coast of Ireland was struck by a large wave that smashed 23 panes, washing some of the lamps down the stairs, and broken glass damaged the reflectors beyond repair. In order to damage the uppermost portion of the lighthouse, water had to surmount a seaside cliff measuring 40 m (130 ft) in height and a further 26 m (85 ft) of lighthouse structure.
- On 13 November 1865, the wooden cutter Aenid was in the Tasman Sea near Long Reef off New South Wales, Australia, when her helmsman sighted three huge waves approaching from her starboard quarter. Before he could turn the cutter to face them, they swamped Aenid and wrecked her with the loss of two lives. Four others on board survived. The wreck later was found washed up on Long Reef with part of its side smashed in.
- On 10 October 1881, two massive waves struck the fishing vessel Alice of Boddam in the mouth of the Firth of Forth less than 1 kilometre (0.6 mi; 0.5 nmi) from Dunbar Harbour while she was attempting to reach Dunbar during a severe storm, sinking her with the loss of all seven members of her crew.
- On 14 February 1883, an enormous wave hit the steamship Glamorgan in the North Atlantic Ocean, sweeping her captain and seven crewmen overboard. The passenger ship SS Republic rescued 44 survivors from Glamorgan on 16 February before she sank.
- On 3 April 1884, an immense wave wrecked the steamer Daniel Steinmann as she ran aground off Sambro, Nova Scotia, Canada. The wave swept many people overboard and sank the ship, killing all 90 of her passengers and 34 members of her crew.
- On 5 July 1884, a 12-metre (39 ft) rogue wave struck the yacht Mignonette while she was in the Atlantic Ocean off West Africa about 1,600 nautical miles (3,000 km; 1,800 mi) northwest of the Cape of Good Hope, washing away her lee bulwark. She sank five minutes later.
- On 10 October 1903, the British passenger liner RMS Etruria was only four hours out of New York City when, at 2:30 p.m., a freak wave struck her. The wave was reported to be at least 50 feet (15 m) high and struck the ship on the port side. The wave carried away part of the forebridge and smashed the guardrail stanchions. There were a number of first-class passengers sitting in deck chairs close to the bridge, and they caught the full force of the water. One passenger was fatally injured, and several other passengers were hurt.
- On 28 August 1905, the steamship Peconic was making a turn to port during a strong gale when a huge wave approaching from the northeast struck her just after midnight. The impact caused her cargo of 1,500 tons of coal to shift, and she heeled over and sank almost immediately, killing 20 of her crew of 22.
- The Blue Anchor Line luxury steamer SS Waratah, an Australian ship of 16,000 gross register tons, disappeared without trace south of Durban, South Africa, in July 1909 with 211 passengers and crew aboard. No survivors or wreckage were found. The most plausible theory for her disappearance is that she encountered a rogue wave which either caused her to capsize or flooded her cargo holds, sinking her almost instantly.
- On 10 January 1910, a wave struck the liner RMS Lusitania during a storm in the Atlantic Ocean west of Ireland, smashing the windows in her bridge and pilot house 75 feet (23 m) above the waterline, pushing her bridge back 2 inches (51 mm), and permanently depressing her bridge and forecastle deck by several inches. Water reached the top of her wheelhouse, 80 feet (24 m) above her deck.
- On 6 February 1914 at 3 p.m., a rogue wave (known at the time as a "cumulative wave") struck the starboard bow of the liner RMS Oceanic in the Atlantic Ocean 500 nautical miles (930 km; 580 mi) west of Ireland, breaking in two the steel fore-and-aft bridge connecting the spar deck with the forecastle. The wave shattered three one-inch (2.5 cm) deckhouse windows and a stateroom porthole protected by heavy steel shutters; fragments of the porthole passed through the stateroom with great force, inflicting a head injury on a passenger, and one fragment embedded itself in a heavy oak casement. The wave also created a four-foot (1.2 m) wall of water that washed aft down the promenade deck, nearly sweeping overboard a group of nine passengers on deck chairs, two of whom had to swim across the deck to reach the safety of the saloon companionway, and leaving one man wedged between two ventilators.
- On 7 February 1914, a rogue wave struck the liner RMS Olympic in the mid-Atlantic Ocean, shattering eight portholes, swamping the dining saloon during lunch, and injuring the ship's purser and several passengers.
- On 31 December 1914 at 4:40 p.m., United States Lighthouse Service Captain Fred Harrington, lighthouse keeper at Trinidad Head Light on Trinidad Head in Trinidad, California, saw a wave 200 yards (180 m) offshore approaching the bluff on which the lighthouse stood which washed completely over 93-foot-tall (28 m) Pilot Rock offshore, appeared to him to rise to the level of the lighthouse's lantern 196 feet (60 m) above sea level, and then broke over the top of the 175-foot-tall (53 m) bluff on which the lighthouse stood. It was the largest recorded ocean wave ever to strike the United States West Coast, and Harrington's report that that wave crested at the height of the lantern and that it buried the area between the lighthouse and the bluff in water which rose to the lighthouse's balcony suggests a possible wave height of 200 feet (61 m). The wave's impact shook the lighthouse and extinguished the light, although Harrington restored service in four hours.
- On 7 November 1915 at 2:27 a.m., the British battleship HMS Albemarle suffered severe damage during a storm in the Pentland Firth when two large waves struck her in rapid succession. Water rose as high as the bottom of her lower foretop, filling it with water, sweeping her forward deck clear, smashing her forebridge – much of which was found in pieces on her upper deck – wrecking her chart house, shifting the roof of her conning tower, and flooding her forward main gun turret, mess decks, and flats. Five of her crew died, and 17 others suffered serious injuries.
- At midnight on 5–6 May 1916 the British polar explorer Ernest Shackleton was at the tiller of the small sailboat James Caird in the Southern Ocean during a storm when he thought he saw the bad weather clearing in the west, astern. He then realized that what he thought was a line of white clouds above a clear dark sky was actually the crest of a single enormous wave that struck and nearly swamped the boat. Shackleton reported that the wave was larger than any he had ever seen before in his 26 years of seafaring.
- On 29 August 1916 at about 4:40 p.m., the United States Navy armored cruiser USS Memphis was wrecked in Santo Domingo harbor in the Dominican Republic when struck in rapid succession by three waves of up to 70 feet (21 meters) in height, killing 40 men and injuring 204. The waves also damaged and nearly capsized the U.S. Navy gunboat USS Castine, which also was in the harbor. Once described as a tsunami, the waves have more recently been assessed as exceptionally large, freak wind-driven waves generated by passing hurricanes.
- In August 1924, the British ocean liner Homeric arrived in New York City late after steaming through a hurricane off the United States East Coast in which an 80-foot (24 m) rogue wave struck her, injuring seven people, smashing numerous windows and portholes, carrying away one of her lifeboats, and snapping chairs and other fittings from their fastenings.
- In February 1926 in the North Atlantic a massive wave hit the British passenger liner RMS Olympic, smashing four of the bridge's nine glass windows and doing some other damage.
- During a storm on 31 January 1930, a huge wave hit the American ocean liner Minnekahda in the Atlantic Ocean. It tore off part of the deck railing from her starboard side, damaged some of her davits, carried away several of her ventilators, and flooded her smoking room with several inches of water.
- In 1933 in the North Pacific, the U.S. Navy oiler USS Ramapo (AO-12) encountered a huge wave. The crew triangulated its height at 112 feet (34 m).
- In 1934 in the North Atlantic an enormous wave smashed over the bridge of the British passenger liner RMS Majestic, injuring the first officer and the White Star Line's final commodore, Edgar J. Trant, who was hospitalised for a month and never sailed again.
- In December 1942 while operating as a troopship and carrying 11,339 United States Army troops and crew, the British passenger liner RMS Queen Mary was broadsided during a gale by a 92-foot (28 m) wave 608 nautical miles (700 mi; 1,126 km) from Scotland and nearly capsized. Queen Mary listed briefly about 52 degrees before slowly righting herself. Had the ship listed even three degrees more, then she would have capsized.

=== Second half of the 20th century ===
- On 5 February 1963, the French Navy light cruiser Jeanne d'Arc encountered a rogue wave while serving as the training ship of the French Naval Academy.
- On 12 April 1966, the Italian liner Michelangelo was in the Atlantic Ocean steaming toward New York City in a storm, frequently encountering 20-metre (66 ft) waves, when a giant wave struck her, breaking 18 metres (59 ft) over her bow. It traveled 70 metres (230 ft) aft along her deck and struck her superstructure, smashing 2-centimetre (0.8 in) thick windows on her bridge over 25 metres (82 ft) above the waterline. It tore a hole in the superstructure, killed two passengers instantly, fatally injured a crewman who died a few hours later, and injured over 50 other people, 10 of them gravely.
- In 1968 the sailing yacht Suhaili was in the Southern Ocean in high winds and a 40-to-50-foot (12 to 15 m) swell when her captain came on deck and sighted a breaking wave approaching from astern which stretched from horizon to horizon and was twice the height of the swell, indicating a height of at least 80 feet (24 m). He climbed into the rigging to avoid being washed overboard and reported that the entire yacht became submerged except for her two masts before she resurfaced after the wave passed.
- The Wilstar, a Norwegian tanker, suffered structural damage from a rogue wave in 1974.
- In October 1977, the tanker MS Stolt Surf encountered a rogue wave on a voyage across the Pacific from Singapore to Portland, Oregon. Her engineer took photos of the wave, which was higher than the 72-foot (22 m) bridge deck.
- The six-year-old, 37,134-ton barge carrier MS München was lost at sea in 1978. At 3 a.m. on 12 December 1978 she sent out a garbled mayday message from the mid-Atlantic, but rescuers found only "a few bits of wreckage." This included an unlaunched lifeboat, stowed 66 feet (20 m) above the water line, which had one of its attachment pins "twisted as though hit by an extreme force." The Maritime Court concluded that "bad weather had caused an unusual event." It is thought that a large wave knocked out the ship's controls (the bridge was sited forward), causing the ship to shift side-on to heavy seas, which eventually overwhelmed it. Although more than one wave was probably involved, this remains the most likely sinking due to a freak wave.
- The 30-foot (9.1 m) sailing yacht Grimalkin was in the Celtic Sea participating in the 1979 Fastnet Race when a very steep 40-foot (12.2 m) breaking wave with a 10-foot (3 m) tall curl broke over her from astern during a storm on August 14, 1979, pitchpoling her and killing two members of her crew, incapacitating another crewman who was incorrectly presumed dead and left aboard, and prompting the other three members of her crew to abandon ship in a life raft. The man left aboard the dismasted Grimalkin and the men in the life raft were rescued, and Grimalkin eventually was recovered and repaired.
- The Fastnet Lighthouse off the south coast of Ireland was struck by a 47-meter-high (154-foot-high) wave in 1985.
- The trimaran Rose-Noëlle, capsized on 4 June 1989, when she was struck by a rogue wave in the southern Pacific Ocean off the coast of New Zealand.
- Draupner wave (North Sea, 1995): The first rogue wave to be confirmed with scientific evidence, with a maximum height of 25.6 metres (84 ft).
- The liner Queen Elizabeth 2 encountered a 29-metre (95 ft) wave during Hurricane Luis in the North Atlantic in September 1995. Her master said it "came out of the darkness" and "looked like the White Cliffs of Dover." Newspaper reports at the time described the ocean liner as attempting to "surf" the nearly vertical wave in order not to be sunk.
- During the 1998 Sydney to Hobart Yacht Race, a 120-foot (37 m) high rogue wave was documented in the Tasman Sea by a rescue helicopter during a storm on 27–28 December 1998.
- In February 2000, the British oceanographic research vessel RRS Discovery, operating in the Atlantic Ocean over the Rockall Trough west of Scotland, encountered the largest waves ever recorded by scientific instruments in the open ocean, with a significant wave height of 18.5 metres (61 ft) and individual waves up to 29.1 metres (95 ft) .
- On 4 November 2000, the Channel Islands National Marine Sanctuary research vessel R/V Ballena was hit by a rogue wave and capsized near Point Conception off Santa Barbara, California. The ship was 56 feet (17 m) long, and the wave estimated at 20 feet (6.1 m) high. Two United States Geological Survey (USGS) employees were trapped briefly inside the capsized ship, but they were able to find their way to the bridge doors and escaped. The life raft was inflated and all three people aboard — the vessel's captain, NOAA Commissioned Officer Corps Lieutenant Commander Mark H. Pickett, and the two USGS employees — attempted to paddle out of the surf zone. The size of the raft and drogue anchor prevented escape in the raft. The crew donned the two available life jackets and all three attempted to swim to a pocket beach on Point Arguello. After Pickett made shore he swam back out to assist both of the USGS employees to shore. One USGS employee was treated for facial lacerations and a slight concussion. Ballena, operated by National Oceanic and Atmospheric Administration (NOAA) at the time, broke apart in the waves against the rocky shore and was a total loss. Pickett received the Department of Commerce Gold Medal for heroism on 30 October 2001.

=== 21st century ===
- The Bahamian-registered cruise ships MS Bremen and MS Caledonian Star encountered 30-meter (98 ft) freak waves in the South Atlantic in 2001. Bridge windows on both ships were smashed, and all power and instrumentation lost.
- Naval Research Laboratory ocean-floor pressure sensors detected a freak wave caused by Hurricane Ivan in the Gulf of Mexico in 2004. The wave was around 27.7 meters (91 ft) high from peak to trough, and around 200 meters (660 ft) long.
- Norwegian Dawn, (three waves in succession, off the coast of Georgia, 16 April 2005): "The sea had actually calmed down when the 21-metre (69 ft) wave seemed to come out of thin air… Our captain, who has 20 years on the job, said he never saw anything like it." "The water exerted enough force to shear off the welds for the aluminum rail supports on the [ninth- and tenth-level] balconies of two cabins, allowing the teak balcony rails to break loose and crash into the cabin windows. The broken glass filling the drains compounded the water damage by allowing a large amount of water to enter the two cabins and damage the carpets in 61 other cabins. The ship's operating at reduced speed when the waves hit probably limited the damage."
- Aleutian Ballad, (Bering Sea, 2005): Footage of a rogue wave appears in an episode of Deadliest Catch from Season 2, Episode 4 "Finish Line" (Original airdate: 28 April 2006). While sailing through rough seas during a night time storm, a "freak wave", believed to be around 60 feet (18 meters) high, violently hits the fishing vessel's starboard side. The wave cripples the vessel, causing the boat to tip onto its side at a 30-degree angle. The boat manages to right itself; some of the crew suffer minor injuries. One of the few video recordings of (what might be) a rogue wave.
- In June 2005 a pair of rogue waves struck two participants in a fishing competition which capsized their 34-foot (10 m) boat 38 miles (33 nmi; 61 km) off Merritt Island, Bahamas. One of them later said, "One second everything is going great. The next second we're upside down in the Atlantic Ocean, 30 miles (26 nmi; 48 km) out ... We weren't going fast, but the speed of the wave – the back wave pushed us into the front one," and "The sea had essentially dropped out ... It was just like we were just tumbling straight down and picking up speed at a wave that was triple the size of what we were just dealing with". The United States Coast Guard rescued both people 30 hours later, after an extended search.Brittany Ferries' MV Pont-Aven was struck by a wave estimated at between 40 and 50 feet (12 and 15 m) in height during a Force 9 gale in the Bay of Biscay on 21 May 2006.
- On 1 February 2007, Holland America's cruise ship MS Prinsendam was hit by two 12-meter (39 ft) tall rogue waves near Cape Horn. There were around 40 injuries, with some requiring hospitalization.
- On 14 April 2008, 0.5 nautical miles (0.9 km; 0.6 mi) off Kleinbaai, near Gansbaai, South Africa – a freak wave hit a dive boat carrying tourists on a diving trip to see sharks. The boat capsized. Three tourists died, two were seriously injured. and a number were treated for shock. Multiple other dive boats witnessed the wave.
- On 3 March 2010, in the Mediterranean Sea off Marseille, France, a 26-foot (7.9-meter) wave hit the Cypriot liner Louis Majesty, killing two people on board. The height of the wave was reported to be abnormally high with respect to the sea state at the time of the incident.
- In March 2014, a massive wave struck Roi-Namur in Kwajalein Atoll in the Marshall Islands on an otherwise calm, sunny day, penetrating well inland, flooding parts of the island and swamping coastal roads.
- On 8 September 2019, in the Cabot Strait off Channel-Port aux Basques, Newfoundland, during Hurricane Dorian, several rogue waves were detected by an off-shore buoy. Five of these rogue waves reached heights of 20 meters (66 feet) with the largest of the waves reaching 30 meters (98 feet).
- On 17 November 2020, a buoy moored in 45 metres (148 ft) of water on Amphitrite Bank in the Pacific Ocean 7 kilometres (4.3 mi; 3.8 nmi) off Ucluelet, British Columbia, Canada, at 48.9°N 125.6°W recorded a lone 17.6-metre (58 ft) tall wave among surrounding waves about 6 metres (20 ft) in height. One scientific paper and various press reports claimed in February 2022 that at 2.93 times the significant wave height, the Ucluelet wave set a record as the most extreme rogue wave ever recorded at the time in terms of its height in proportion to surrounding waves, and that scientists estimated that a wave about three times higher than those around it occurs on average only once every 1,300 years worldwide. The claims that the wave set a record or is especially rare are controversial, as evidence exists for even more proportionately extreme waves occurring, and on a more frequent basis.
- On 29 November 2022, a rogue wave hit the Viking cruise ship Viking Polaris while she was on her way to Ushuaia, Argentina. One person died, four more were injured, and the ship's scheduled voyage to Antarctica was canceled.
- On 18 September 2023 a suspected rogue wave or sneaker wave smashed into a beachside restaurant at Marina Beach near Southbroom, South Africa, injuring seven people. One restaurant patron was swept out to sea but rescued by lifeguards. The wave was filmed.
- On 20 January 2024, one or more rogue or sneaker waves struck the United States Army's Ronald Reagan Ballistic Missile Defense Test Site on Roi-Namur in Kwajalein Atoll in the Marshall Islands, breaking down the doors of a dining hall, knocking several people off their feet, moderately to severely damaging the dining hall, the Outrigger Bar and Grill, the chapel, and the Tradewinds Theater, and leaving parts of the island, including the automotive complex, under water. The wave or waves penetrated 300 feet (91 m) inland and probably were between 29 and 40 feet (8.8 and 12.2 m) tall, with a significant wave height of 10 feet (3 m) to 15 feet (4.6 m). The flooding of the dining hall was filmed.
- On 18 July 2026, the 38.6-metre (127-foot) motor ferry Barima — with probably 179 people aboard — capsized and sank in the North Atlantic Ocean off the coast of Guyana at 07°28.213′N 058°23.443′W, 7 miles (6.1 nmi; 11 km) northeast of the mouth of the Pomeroon River, after a large wave struck her. Seventy-six people were rescued.
