= James P. Delgado =

American maritime archaeologist, explorer and author

James Preston Delgado FRGS, FRCGS
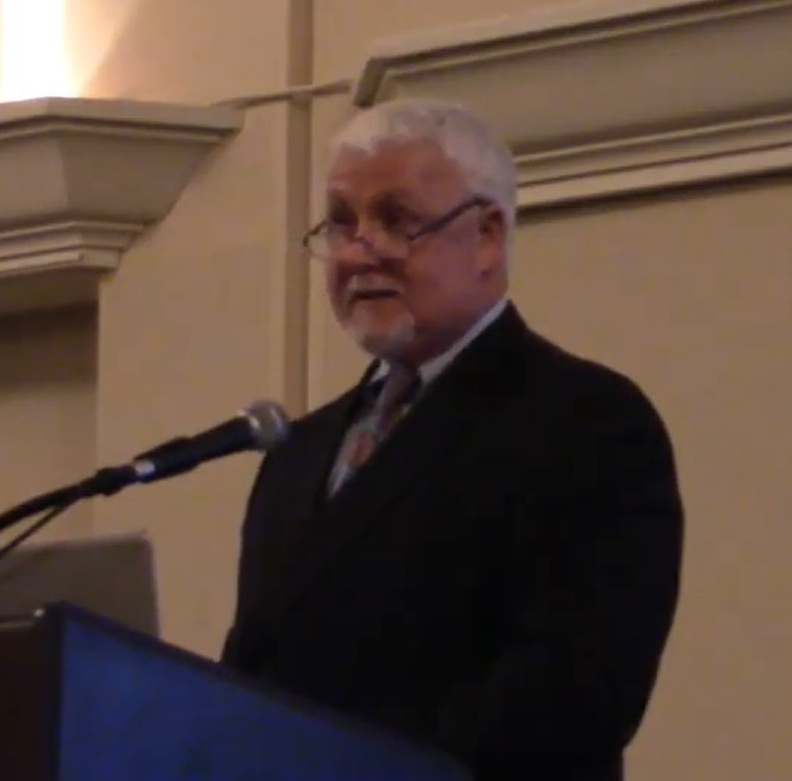
- Delgado delivering a lecture in 2015
- Born: James Preston Delgado; January 11, 1958 (age 68); San Jose, California, U.S.
- Occupations: Maritime archaeologist, explorer, author, TV host, historian
- Spouse: Ann Goodhart
- Awards: Officer of the Order of Civil Merit (Spain)
- Scientific career
- Known for: His work on underwater exploration and shipwreck investigations

Academic background
- Education: B.A. in American History; M.A. in Maritime History and Underwater Research; Ph.D. in Archeology
- Alma mater: Simon Fraser University
- Influences: Theodore "Ted" C. Hinckley, Constance B. "Connie" Perham, Edwin C. Bearss

Academic work
- Discipline: Archaeology, history, journalism
- Sub-discipline: Maritime archaeology, maritime history, underwater research
- Main interests: Maritime archaeology, shipwreck investigations, and the preservation and documentation of maritime heritage
- Website: jamesdelgado.com

James Preston Delgado FRGS, FRCGS (born January 11, 1958) is an American maritime archaeologist, historian, and author. He has participated in shipwreck investigations worldwide, including the USS Independence (CVL-22), USS Monitor, USS Arizona (BB-39), USS Nevada (BB-36), and the slave ship Clotilda.

Delgado has worked at the U.S. National Park Service and the National Oceanic and Atmospheric Administration's (NOAA) maritime heritage programs. He is an Officer in Spain's Order of Civil Merit.

== Early life and education ==
Delgado was born on January 11, 1958, in San Jose, California. He grew up in Blossom Valley and at the age of ten, Delgado was influenced by lessons on ancient Egypt, Greece, and Rome from his teachers. During high school, Delgado worked alongside Bay Area archaeologists Chester King, Linda King, and Rob Edwards. He also interacted with graduate students from an archaeology class at San Jose State University. As an undergraduate at San Jose State, and influenced by Theodore "Ted" C. Hinckley, he studied history and later transferred to San Francisco State University as a cooperative education student with the National Park Service. He graduated with a B.A. in American history in 1981.

== Career ==
=== Early career ===
By fourteen, Delgado's curiosity led him to a construction site near his home in the Santa Teresa Hills, where the remains of the Ohlone people were discovered. This site, which later became the Rancho de Santa Teresa, was being destroyed despite the presence of archaeologists. Delgado, initially volunteering alone, began mapping, photographing, and recovering artifacts from the site, continuing his efforts through high school. He later assisted in an excavation in 1980. The experience had a significant impact on Delgado, leading him to prepare the nomination papers for the site, which was listed on the National Register of Historic Places in 1975 as site #75002184. His research notes and materials are archived in the San Jose Public Library, documenting his early explorations of the nearby foothills.

In 1972, Delgado met with San Jose Mayor Norman Y. Mineta to advocate for changes in laws to protect archaeological sites. Mineta appointed him the San Jose Youth Commission's Liaison to the city's Historical Landmarks Commission. After serving for three years, Mayor Janet Gray Hayes appointed Delgado as a commissioner in 1976. He also served on the San Jose Bicentennial Commission and participated in the first inventory of historical and architectural heritage in 1977 and the Santa Clara County Heritage Inventory.

While at the Vancouver Maritime Museum, Delgado returned to university to obtain his Ph.D. in archaeology, receiving the degree in 2006 from Simon Fraser University.

Delgado's early work notably included documenting shipwreck remains and the surrounding environmental conditions exposed by beach erosion. He was a pioneer in this area of archaeology in the United States, starting with the wrecks of the schooner Neptune and those within the Golden Gate National Recreation Area.

=== National Park Service ===
While working for the National Park Service (NPS) as the first Park Historian for Golden Gate National Recreation Area (GGNRA) serving from 1979 to 1986, Delgado co-directed the archaeological excavation of Civil War Black Point battery at Fort Mason with Martin T. Mayer.

In 1987, Delgado became the first Maritime Historian of the National Park Service and the founding chief of the NPS maritime preservation program, the National Maritime Initiative (NMI). The NMI at that time functioned as the maritime preservation program for the entire federal government. The Initiative later became known as the NPS Maritime Heritage Program In this role, Delgado oversaw the creation of classification standards and guidelines for preservation and documentation. Delgado was the principal author of the National Register of Historic Places' guidelines for nominating historic ships and shipwrecks and co-authored the National Register Bulletin for nominating historic aids to navigation.

Working from the inventory, Delgado applied the criterion of the National Register of Historic Places and the National Historic Landmarks Program to determine which of some 330 large historic vessels were of national significance. Delgado's work led to the nominations of the schooner Adventuress and the schooner American Eagle.

As part of his duties, and with his degree in maritime archaeology, Delgado closely interacted with the National Park Service's Submerged Cultural Resources Center as well as the Chief Archaeologist of the NPS during his tenure with the National Maritime Initiative. This included co-authoring the guidelines for the implementation of the Abandoned Shipwreck Act of 1987 following a series of national public meetings.

Delgado also joined the Submerged Cultural Resources Unit (SCRU); one of his final assignments was co-authoring the first submerged cultural resources assessment for the region where he first worked, the Golden Gate National Recreation Area, Point Reyes National Seashore, and the Gulf of the Farallones National Marine Sanctuary.

=== NOAA Office of National Marine Sanctuaries ===
After a one-year sabbatical from the NPS, from 1984 to 1985, to attend East Carolina University, Delgado graduated with a master's degree in Maritime History and Underwater Research. His thesis focused on the Gold Rush steamer Tennessee, located in Tennessee Cove within the Golden Gate National Recreation Area. He was subsequently assigned by NPS Chief Historian Edwin C. Bearss to work as a project historian on the USS Monitor project with the National Oceanic and Atmospheric Administration (NOAA). That work led to a series of historical and archaeological context studies, and Delgado personally completed the successful nomination for Monitor's designation as one of the first National Historic Landmark shipwrecks in the United States. He subsequently completed the National Historic Landmark studies for the wrecks of USS Arizona and USS Utah at Pearl Harbor. As of 2018, there are only nine National Historic Landmark shipwrecks or hulks that have been designated by the Secretary of the Interior.

In October 2010, he left INA to become the Director of Maritime Heritage in the Office of National Marine Sanctuaries for the National Oceanic & Atmospheric Administration in Washington, D.C.

=== Maritime archaeology ===
Following his doctoral graduation in 2006, he was named and remains an Adjunct Member of the Faculty of the Department of Archaeology at Simon Fraser University. From 2001 to 2006, he hosted and was the team archaeologist on, the popular Canadian-made National Geographic international documentary series.

Delgado worked closely with NOAA's Office of Ocean Exploration in the telepresence-enabled archaeological reconnaissance of the wreck of the SS Coast Trader.

=== SEARCH, Inc. ===
In 2017, Delgado retired from public service and became the Senior Vice President of SEARCH, Inc., an American cultural resources and archaeological firm.

=== In the media ===
Delgado has appeared in documentary films since the 1990s to promote archaeology and history.

Delgado has appeared as a guest speaker at the TED-inspired EG series in Monterey, and at IdeaCity in Toronto.

== Personal life ==
Delgado is married to his wife Ann.

== Awards and honors ==
Delgado is an officer in the Spanish Order of Civil Merit.

== Selected bibliography ==
=== Books ===
- Delgado, James P. (27 June 2019). War at Sea: A Shipwrecked History from Antiquity to the Twentieth Century. Oxford University Press. ISBN 9780190888022.
- Delgado, James P. (2012). Misadventures of a civil war submarine: Iron, guns, and pearls. Texas A&M University Press.
- Silent Killers: Submarines and Underwater Warfare. Osprey Publishing. 2011. ISBN 978-1-84908-365-2.
- Nuclear Dawn: The Atomic Bomb from the Manhattan Project to the Cold War. Osprey Publishing. 2009. ISBN 978-1-84603-396-4.
- Khubilai Khan's Lost Fleet: In Search of a Legendary Armada. University of California Press. 2009. ISBN 978-0-520-25976-8.
- Gold Rush Port: The Maritime Archaeology of San Francisco's Waterfront. University of California Press. 2009. ISBN 978-0-520-25580-7.
- Adventures of a Sea Hunter: In Search of Famous Shipwrecks. Douglas & McIntyre. 2004. ISBN 978-1-55365-071-3.
- Joy Waldron Jasper; James P. Delgado; Jim Adams (2001). The USS Arizona: the ship, the men, the Pearl Harbor attack, and the symbol that aroused America. Macmillan. ISBN 978-0-312-28690-3.
- Delgado, James P. (1999). Across the top of the world: the quest for the Northwest Passage. Douglas & McIntyre. ISBN 978-1550547344.

=== Edited books ===
- Delgado, J. P., Marx, D. E., Lent, K., Grinnan, J., & DeCaro, A. (2023). Clotilda: The history and archaeology of the last slave ship. University of Alabama Press.
- Delgado, J. P., & Nagiewicz, S. D. (2020). Robert J. Walker: the history and archaeology of a US coast survey steamship. University Press of Florida.
- Carol Ruppé; Jan Barstad, eds. (2002). "Marine and Underwater Archaeology on the Pacific Coast". International handbook of underwater archaeology. Springer. ISBN 978-0-306-46345-7.
- Delgado, J. P., Mendizábal, T., Hanselmann, F. H., & Rissolo, D. (2016). The maritime landscape of the Isthmus of Panamá. University Press of Florida

=== Selected papers ===
- Delgado, J. P. (2024). The Blake Ridge Wreck: A Deepwater Antebellum American Fishing Craft. Journal of Maritime Archaeology, 1-36.
- Brennan, M. L., Delgado, J. P., Jozsef, A., Marx, D. E., & Bierwagen, M. (2023). Site formation processes and pollution risk mitigation of World War II oil tanker shipwrecks: Coimbra and Munger T. Ball. Journal of Maritime Archaeology, 18(2), 321-335.
- Delgado, J. P., Brennan, M. L., Haoa, S. A. R., Leong, J. H. R., Gaymer, C. F., Carabias, D., ... & Wagner, D. (2022). The hidden landscape: maritime cultural heritage of the Salas y Gómez and Nazca ridges with implications for conservation on the high seas. Marine Policy, 136, 104877.
- Delgado, J. P., Brennan, M. L., Elliott, K., Matthews, R. E., Lickliter-Mundon, M., Lambert, J. G., ... & Schwemmer, R. V. (2018). Archaeological survey of the ex-USS Independence (CVL22). Journal of Maritime Archaeology, 13, 123-144.
- Brennan, M. L., Cantelas, F., Elliott, K., Delgado, J. P., Bell, K. L., Coleman, D., ... & Ballard, R. D. (2018). Telepresence-enabled maritime archaeological exploration in the deep. Journal of Maritime Archaeology, 13, 97-121.
- Brennan, M. L., Davis, D., Ballard, R. D., Trembanis, A. C., Vaughn, J. I., Krumholz, J. S., ... & DuVal, C. (2016). Quantification of bottom trawl fishing damage to ancient shipwreck sites. Marine Geology, 371, 82-88.
- Delgado, J. P. (2000). Underwater archaeology at the dawn of the 21st century. Historical Archaeology, 34(4), 9-13.

== See also ==
- Institute of Nautical Archaeology
- National Oceanic and Atmospheric Administration (NOAO)
