= War at Sea: A Shipwrecked History from Antiquity to the Twentieth Century =

2019 book by James P. Delgado

- Cover
- Author: James P. Delgado
- Language: English
- Subject: Maritime archaeology, Naval warfare history
- Genre: Non-fiction
- Publisher: Oxford University Press
- Publication date: 2019
- Publication place: United States
- Pages: 488
- Awards: James Deetz Award from the Society for Historical Archaeology
- ISBN: 978-0190888015

War at Sea: A Shipwrecked History from Antiquity to the Twentieth Century is a book by American maritime archaeologist James P. Delgado, published in 2019 by Oxford University Press. The book explores naval warfare through the lens of shipwrecks, spanning over three thousand years of history from ancient civilizations to the Cold War. Drawing on decades of Delgado's own research and underwater explorations, the book present a global perspective on the development of naval warfare, emphasizing the role of archaeology in uncovering the often-overlooked human stories behind these sunken vessels.

== Overview ==
The work is a comprehensive examination of naval warfare as revealed through maritime archaeology. The book spans a broad historical timeline, from the earliest naval conflicts in ancient civilizations to the complex battles of the Cold War. Organized chronologically, the book delves into key periods of naval history, including the Classic Age, the rise of gunpowder warfare, the age of sail, the transition to iron and steam, and the major global conflicts of the 20th century.

Each of the ten chapters is centered around specific shipwrecks that exemplify the naval technology and strategies of their time. Delgado provides detailed descriptions of these wrecks, supported by archaeological findings that often challenge or expand the existing historical record. For instance, the book covers the discovery of ancient warships from the Battle of Actium, the wreck of the Spanish Armada's ships, and the remains of World War II battleships and submarines.

While the book is not intended to be an exhaustive history of naval warfare, it highlights significant conflicts and developments where archaeology has provided valuable insights. Delgado also discusses the controversies surrounding the salvage of naval wrecks and the legal and ethical issues related to the preservation of these underwater cultural heritage sites.

== Reviews ==
In his review, Ben Ford highlighted the book's engaging and accessible approach to global naval history through the lens of shipwrecks. Ford appreciated Delgado's ability to distill decades of research into a lively narrative that appeals to both general readers and professionals. However, he noted the book's lack of citations and occasional lack of detail, which "confound a professional archaeological audience." Despite these shortcomings, Ford praised the book as "an excellent public invitation to nautical archaeology" and considered it a valuable resource for anyone interested in maritime history.

Innes McCartney praised the book for its comprehensive overview of maritime conflict archaeology, noting that it "represents an excellent overview of where the study of the archaeology of maritime conflict is today." McCartney highlighted the book's ambitious time span, covering from antiquity to the Cold War, and commended Delgado's ability to capture the essence of maritime archaeology's development. However, he criticized the book for lacking a concluding chapter, describing this omission as "something of a disappointment," which left the work feeling incomplete despite its extensive coverage.

Philip Sims provided a favorable review of Delgado's work, highlighting the book as "an eminently readable crash course in naval history" that serves as both an educational and comprehensive resource on military shipwrecks. Sims appreciated Delgado's thematic approach, which transcended cultural and temporal boundaries, making the book accessible and engaging for a broad audience. However, Sims noted a slight imbalance, mentioning that "the bulk of the book is taken up by western seafaring," although he acknowledged Delgado's commendable effort to include naval histories from other cultures despite the challenges in archaeological evidence and scholarship.

== Awards ==
- The James Deetz Award from the Society for Historical Archaeology
