= MS Stolt Surf =

Swedish chemical tanker

History
- Name: Stolt Surf
- Operator: Stolt-Nielsen Inc.
- Builder: Eriksberg, Gothenburg, Sweden
- Launched: 14 August 1970
- Completed: 1970
- Identification: IMO number: 7027588
- Fate: Scrapped March 2000

General characteristics
- Class & type: Chemical tanker
- Tonnage: 23,299 deadweight tons
- Length: 556 ft 6 in (169.62 m)
- Beam: 81 ft 3 in (24.77 m)

MS Stolt Surf was a chemical tanker, operated by Stolt-Nielsen Inc. She achieved a measure of infamy when she was struck and damaged by a rogue wave, an event that was photographed by a crew member and subsequently added to the ongoing debate over the possibility of such waves out in the deep ocean.

== Wave encounter ==
Built in 1970 at the yards of Eriksbergs, of Gothenburg, Sweden, Stolt Surf joined the merchant fleet of Stolt-Nielsen Inc., one of the largest operators of parcel tankers in the world. She served for seven years without major incident.

Stolt Surf departed Singapore on 4 October 1977, on a routine voyage across the Pacific Ocean to Portland, in the United States. A storm was brewing out in the Pacific, and the advice from the weather routing agency was to keep far to the north, to avoid a developing storm to the south. Despite being contrary to his experience and instinct, Stolt Surf's Captain Oddenes decided to follow their advice. This proved to be a mistake, when by 20 October Stolt Surf encountered an enormous cyclone. Whilst battling through waves in excess of the usual 10 metres (33 ft), she encountered at least one rogue wave, which towered above the tanker, reaching a height of at least 22 metres (72 ft) and rising above the height of the bridge deck. Several times waves crashed over the bridge itself. Chief engineer Karsten Petersen took a number of pictures of the storm, which recorded several features distinct to freak waves, namely deep troughs and waves so tall that they break.

The breaking wave crashing onto the deck and superstructure of Stolt Surf caused considerable damage. Three of the tank hatches and the door to the pump room were torn off, despite their strong construction. The pipelines running across the decks were bent and the gangways were tossed over the deck and wrecked. Steam pipes and electric cables were torn and ruptured, whilst the wave smashed a number of windows and port holes. Flooding entered the ship, smashing the furniture and tearing off bulkhead panelling. Despite the severe damage, there were no serious injuries, and only one sailor was subsequently hospitalised. Stolt Surf was fortunate in that her engines remained operational, and the ship was able to remain with her bow into the waves. Had she lost headway, the storm would have forced her to turn sideways into the oncoming waves, where she risked being hulled or capsized, particularly if she encountered another rogue wave. Stolt Surf limped into port a week later on 26 October.

=== Consequence ===
The evidence in the photographs showed abnormally large waves out in the deep ocean, where science, using the linear model, had predicted that such extreme waves were extremely rare, to the extent that a 30-metre (98 ft) crest-to-trough wave would occur only once every 10,000 years. The proof gathered by Stolt Surf joined a growing body of evidence that the linear model did not adequately explain all of the types of waves that could be encountered. The loss of MS München in a storm in the North Atlantic the following year was attributed to an 'unknown event', but was later considered to be one of the first losses that could be confidently attributed to a freak wave. Despite this, it was not until the separate encounters by the cruise liners Bremen and Caledonian Star in the South Atlantic, that the possibility of nonlinear causes of freak waves was seriously considered. The resulting theories helped to explain the possible causes of the freak waves encountered by Stolt Surf.

== Fate ==
Stolt Surf was sold in India in March 2000, and broken up for scrap.

Stolt Surf's name was perpetuated in a new tanker built for Stolt-Nielsen and launched in 2000. This vessel has a deadweight tonnage value of 22,219, and is registered in George Town, Cayman Islands.

== See also ==
- Rogue wave
