= Draupner wave =

1995 freak wave

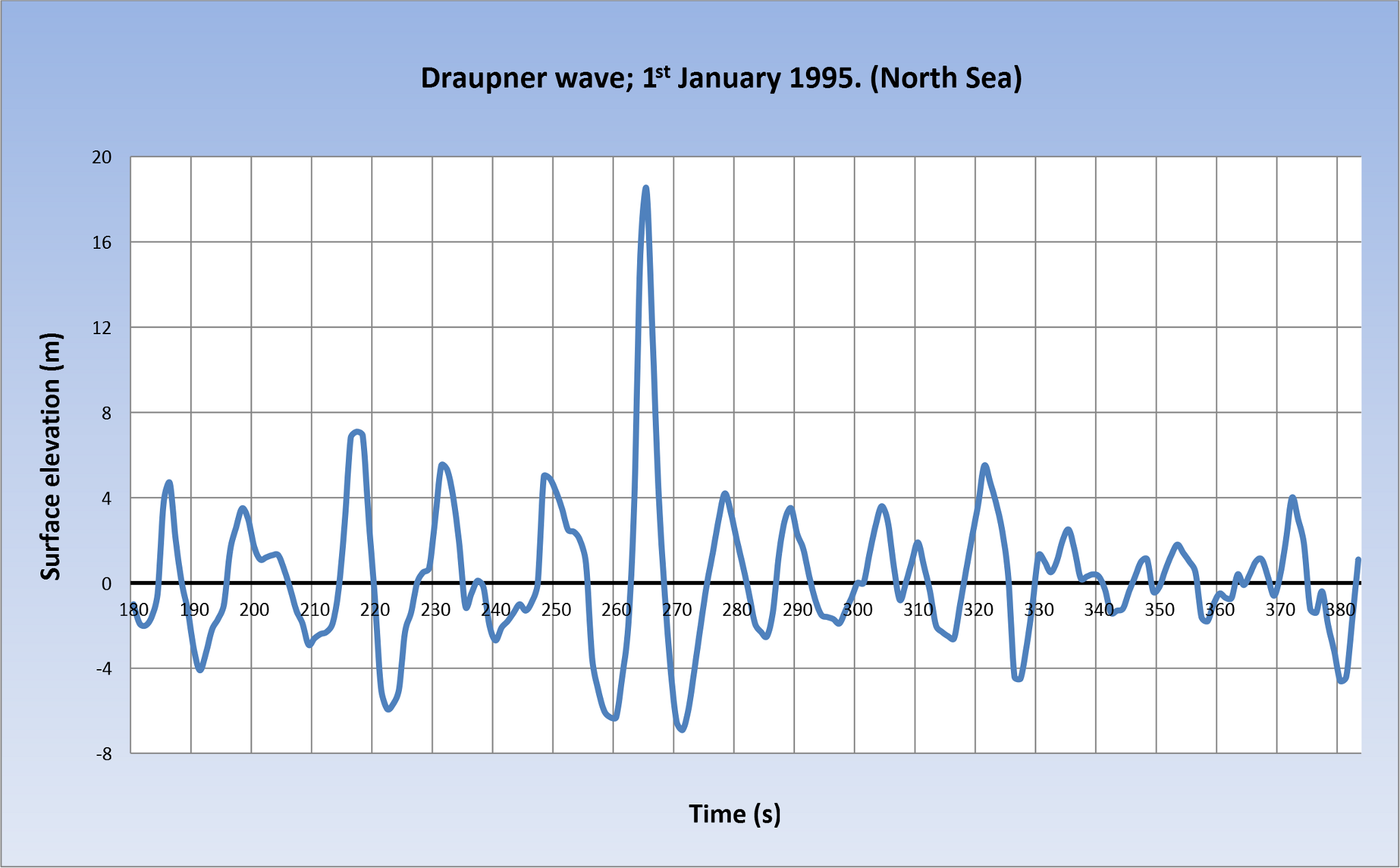
- Sounding graph of the wave; the spike in the center is the peak elevation of the wave. Horizontal axis is seconds after ≈15:20 UTC.

Rogue wave
- Date: 1 January 1995
- Location: Draupner platform
- Height: 25.6 m (84 ft)
- Peak elevation: 18.5 m (61 ft)
- Casualties: 0

The Draupner wave, also known as the New Year's wave or Draupner freak wave, was a rare rogue wave that was the first to be detected by a measuring instrument. The wave, determined to be 25.6 m (84 ft) in height, was recorded on 1 January 1995 at Unit E of the Draupner platform, a gas pipeline support complex located in the North Sea about 160 km (100 miles) southwest from the southern tip of Norway. (Note: The location of the recording was 58°11′19.30″N 2°28′0.00″E)

The Draupner platform rig, located in the Norwegian North Sea and 160 km (99 mi) offshore from Norway, was built to withstand a calculated 1-in-10,000-years wave with a predicted height of 20 m (64 ft) and was fitted with state-of-the-art sensors, including a laser rangefinder wave recorder on the platform's underside.

On 31 December, a low pressure system was located over Sweden, with a north-western motion. This system produced large waves over the North Sea, although none was of significance. Early the next day, a polar low formed over the Norwegian portion of the North Sea, which produced heavy winds that set up the formation of the Draupner wave.

The wave itself was first detected at 15:24 UTC on 1 January 1995 by a downward-pointing laser beam located on the Draupner S platform. The laser beam recorded a rogue wave with a maximum wave height of 25.6 m (84 ft). Peak elevation above still water level was 18.5 m (61 ft). The reading was confirmed by the other sensors. The platform sustained minor damage in the event. In the area, the significant wave height at the time was about 12 m (39 ft), so the Draupner wave was more than twice as tall and steep as its neighbors, with characteristics that fell outside any known wave model. The wave caused enormous interest in the scientific community.

The wave, one of the largest ever documented in the North Sea, helped solidify the initial speculation that rogue waves did naturally occur, and as a result the wave was heavily studied in the years following the event.

== See also ==
- List of rogue waves incidents

== Notes and footnotes ==
=== Sources ===
- Cavaleri, Luigi; Barbariol, Francesco; Benetazzo, Alvise; Bertotti, Luciana (August 2016). "The Draupner wave: A fresh look and the emerging view". ResearchGate. Journal of Geophysical Research.
