= Cape Engaño (Dominican Republic) =

Lighthouse in the Dominican Republic

Cape Engaño lighthouse
- Location: Cape Engaño, Dominican Republic
- Coordinates: 18°34′01″N 68°19′35″W

Tower
- Constructed: 1915
- Construction: metal skeletal tower
- Height: 20 m (66 ft)
- Shape: square pyramidal tower with balcony
- Markings: unpainted (tower)

Light
- First lit: 1990
- Focal height: 43 m (141 ft)
- Range: 11 nmi (20 km; 13 mi)
- Characteristic: Fl W 5s

Cabo Engaño is the easternmost point of the island of Hispaniola, on the territory of the Dominican Republic. Cape Engaño contains dangerous reefs near Santo Domingo. Punta Cana International Airport, the nation's busiest, lies slightly south of the cape.

In 1502, a large part of a Spanish fleet of 30-32 ships filled with treasures and colonists and other men bound for Spain sunk during a violent storm, somewhere close to Cape Engaño. This fleet was sent by order of governor Nicolas Ovando. 5-10 ships, although damaged, survived and returned to the port of departure, except for only one, the "Aguja", which safely reached Spain.

== Climate ==
Climate data for Cape Engaño (Punta Cana) 1961–1990
Month	Jan	Feb	Mar	Apr	May	Jun	Jul	Aug	Sep	Oct	Nov	Dec	Year
Record high °C (°F)	31.0 (87.8)	30.7 (87.3)	31.2 (88.2)	32.0 (89.6)	33.9 (93.0)	34.4 (93.9)	34.7 (94.5)	34.5 (94.1)	34.6 (94.3)	33.7 (92.7)	32.7 (90.9)	32.5 (90.5)	34.7 (94.5)
Mean daily maximum °C (°F)	27.7 (81.9)	27.6 (81.7)	28.1 (82.6)	28.7 (83.7)	29.6 (85.3)	30.3 (86.5)	30.5 (86.9)	30.7 (87.3)	30.9 (87.6)	30.5 (86.9)	29.4 (84.9)	28.1 (82.6)	29.3 (84.7)
Daily mean °C (°F)	24.8 (76.6)	24.7 (76.5)	25.0 (77.0)	25.5 (77.9)	26.4 (79.5)	27.2 (81.0)	27.5 (81.5)	27.7 (81.9)	27.6 (81.7)	27.0 (80.6)	26.3 (79.3)	25.2 (77.4)	26.2 (79.2)
Mean daily minimum °C (°F)	21.9 (71.4)	21.8 (71.2)	22.0 (71.6)	22.5 (72.5)	23.2 (73.8)	24.1 (75.4)	24.6 (76.3)	24.8 (76.6)	24.4 (75.9)	23.6 (74.5)	23.2 (73.8)	22.3 (72.1)	23.2 (73.8)
Record low °C (°F)	16.0 (60.8)	14.0 (57.2)	14.8 (58.6)	15.2 (59.4)	16.0 (60.8)	14.9 (58.8)	19.0 (66.2)	17.9 (64.2)	15.0 (59.0)	15.0 (59.0)	15.9 (60.6)	14.0 (57.2)	14.0 (57.2)
Average rainfall mm (inches)	66.4 (2.61)	54.2 (2.13)	54.2 (2.13)	69.2 (2.72)	124.4 (4.90)	103.9 (4.09)	78.3 (3.08)	103.1 (4.06)	101.7 (4.00)	152.1 (5.99)	116.6 (4.59)	78.5 (3.09)	1,102.6 (43.41)
Average rainy days (≥ 0.1 mm)	10.0	6.8	6.7	6.6	10.1	9.2	9.1	10.0	10.4	11.4	11.5	11.0	112.8
Average relative humidity (%)	82.8	81.4	81.2	82.1	83.0	82.2	82.3	82.6	82.5	83.0	82.2	83.2	82.4
Mean monthly sunshine hours	256.9	241.9	278.8	265.0	249.7	255.1	268.3	271.2	245.2	242.7	238.3	233.2	3,046.3
Source 1: World Meteorological Organization
Source 2: NOAA

== See also ==
- Lists of lighthouses and lightvessels
