= Tennessee Cove =

Embankment in Marin County, California, US

Coordinates: 37.840483°N 122.551643°W

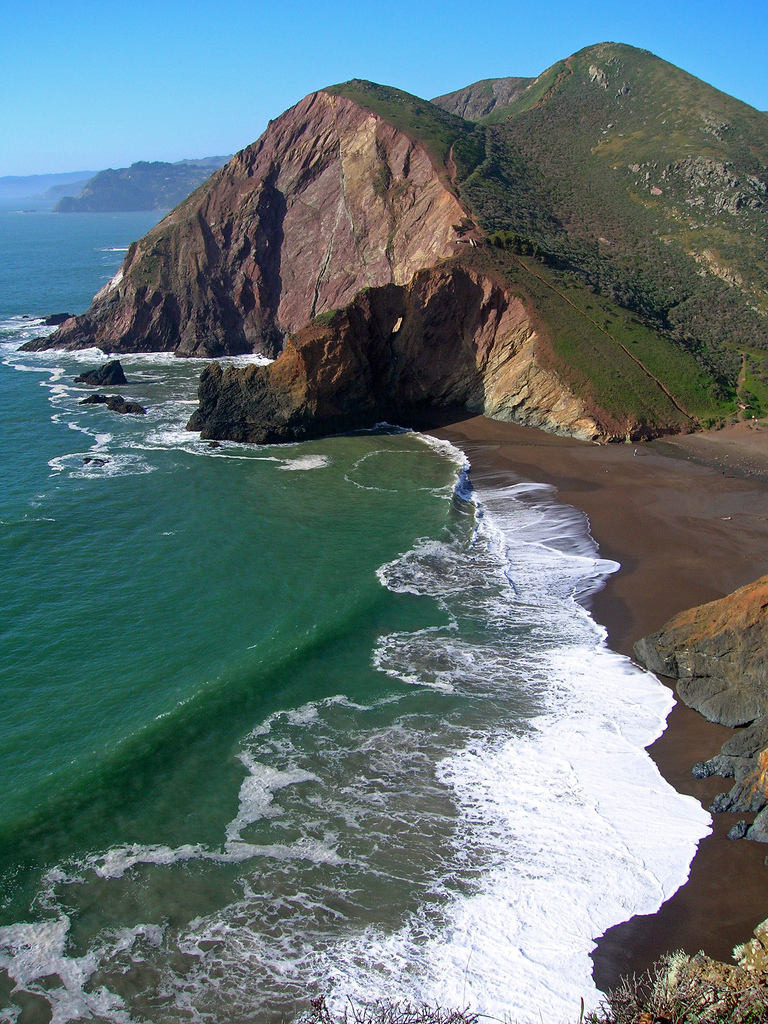
Tennessee Cove, 2012 (arch no longer present as of 2013)

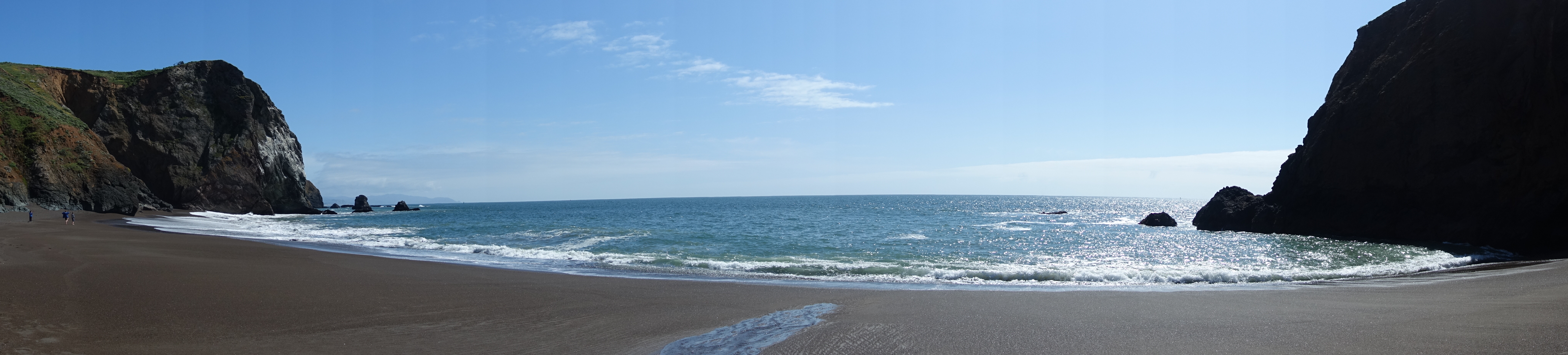
Tennessee Valley Beach

Tennessee Cove is an embankment off the Pacific Ocean in Marin County, California. It is named after the S.S. Tennessee, a steamship that ran aground near here on March 6, 1853. All 550 passengers climbed safely onto the beach, and fourteen chests of gold were salvaged before the ship broke up. Remnants of the ship can still be seen during low tide during some winter days on the south end of the beach.

The cove is a 1.7-mile (2.7 km) hike from the parking lot near the end of Tennessee Valley Road.

== Landmarks ==
On December 29, 2012, the landmark arch at Tennessee Cove collapsed. The landmark had been a popular photography subject over the years.

== Gallery ==
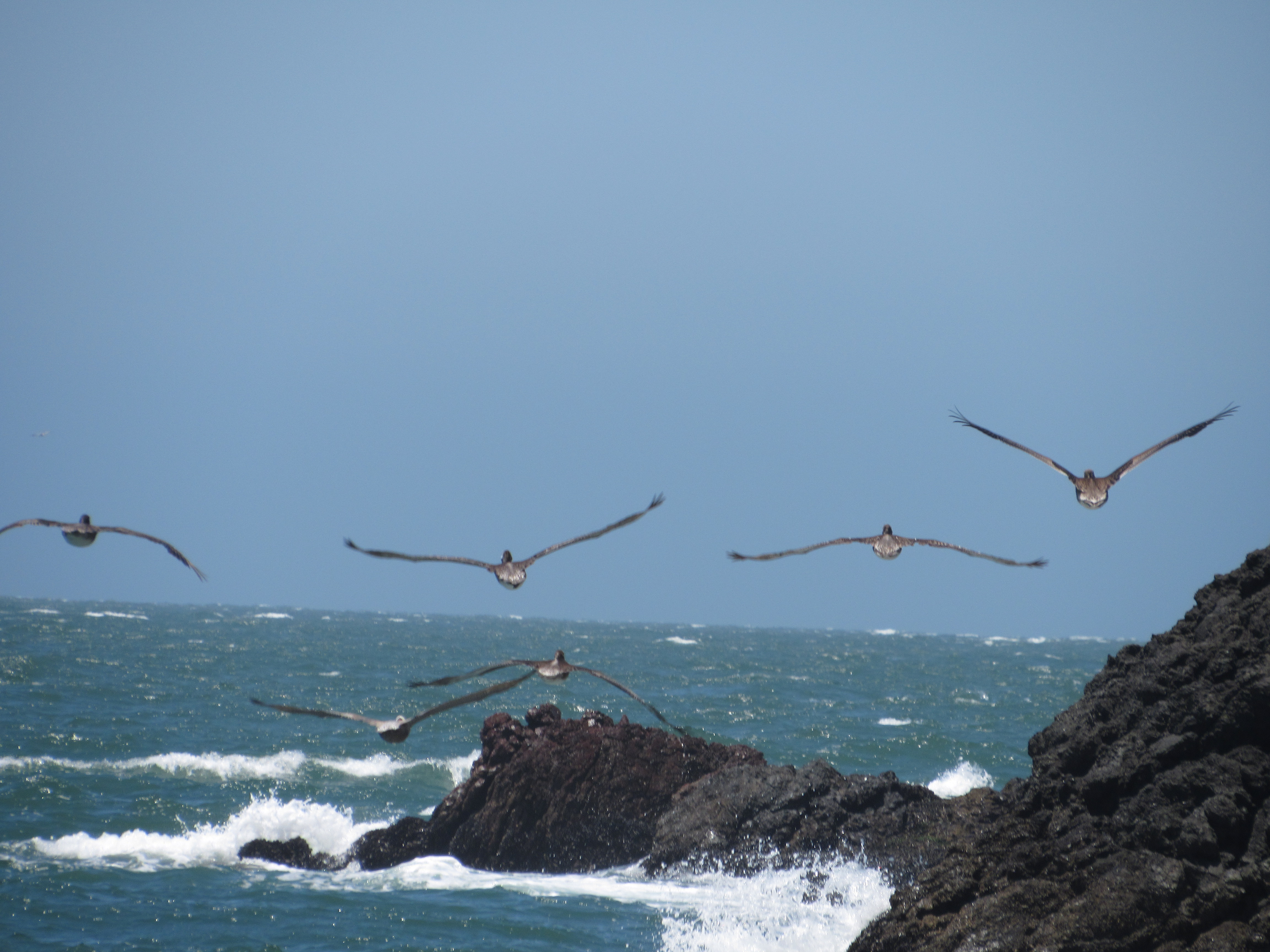
Pelicans fly over Tennessee Cove.

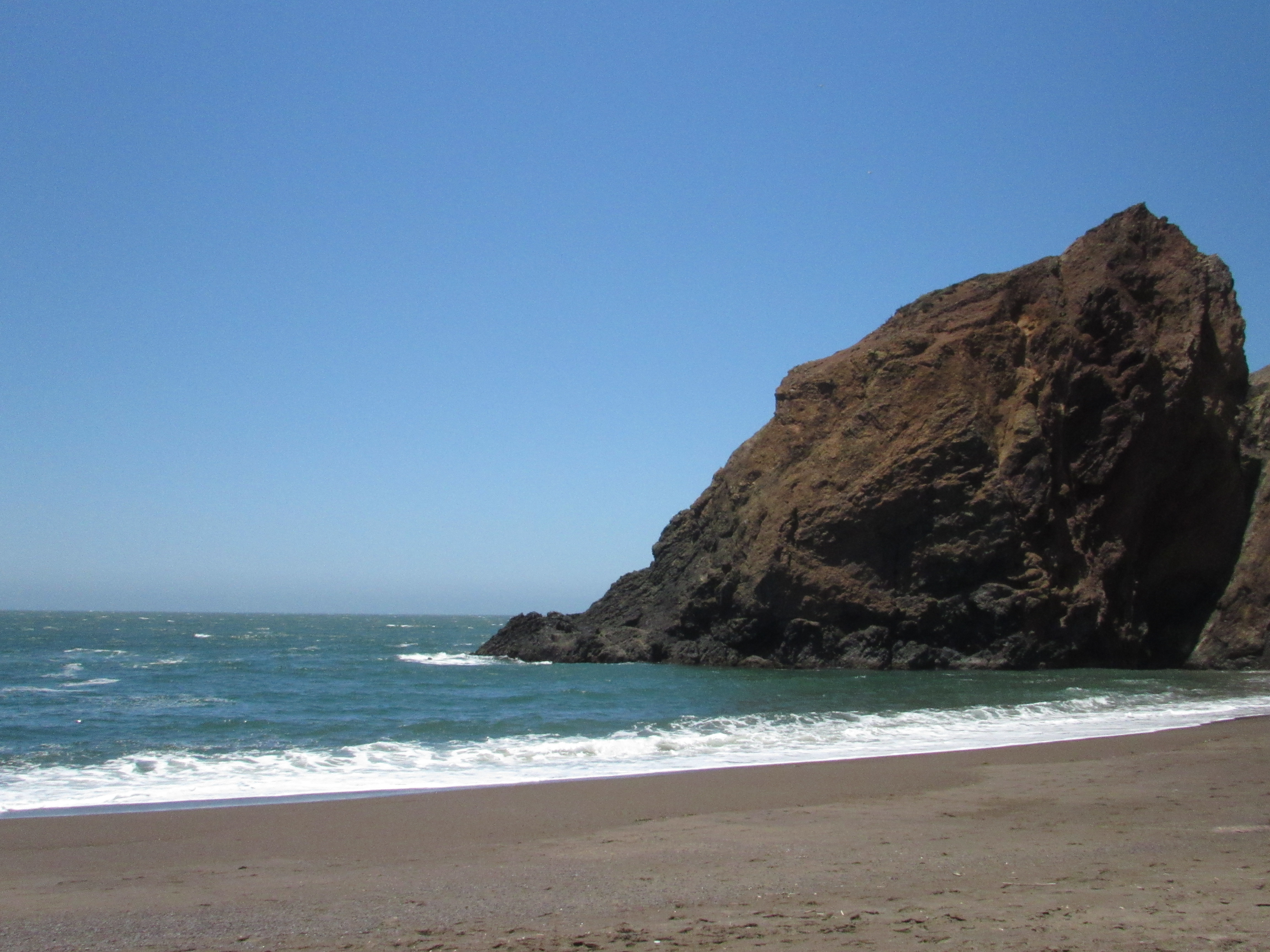
Tennessee Cove

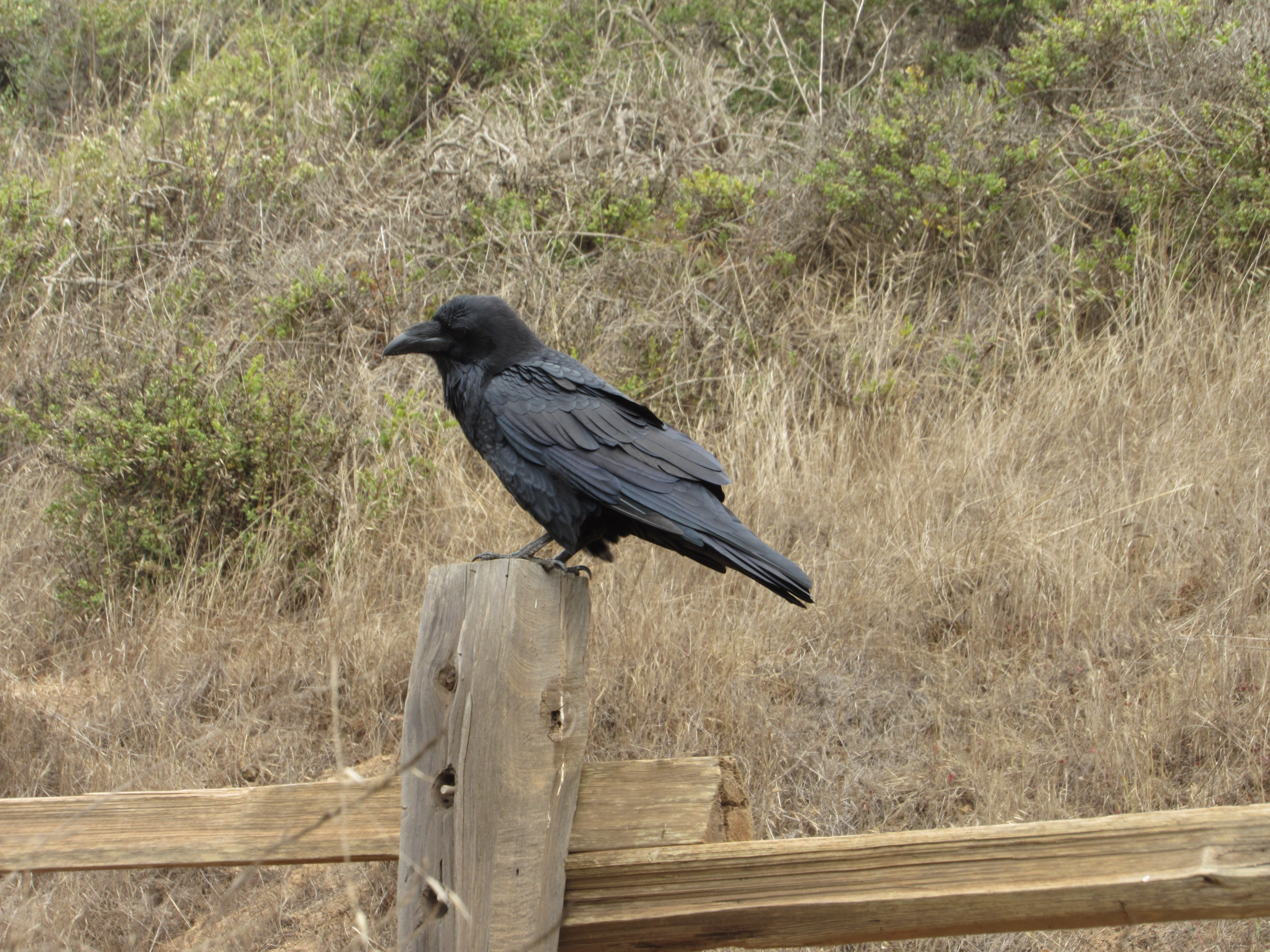
A raven stands on a fence post along the Tennessee Valley trail.

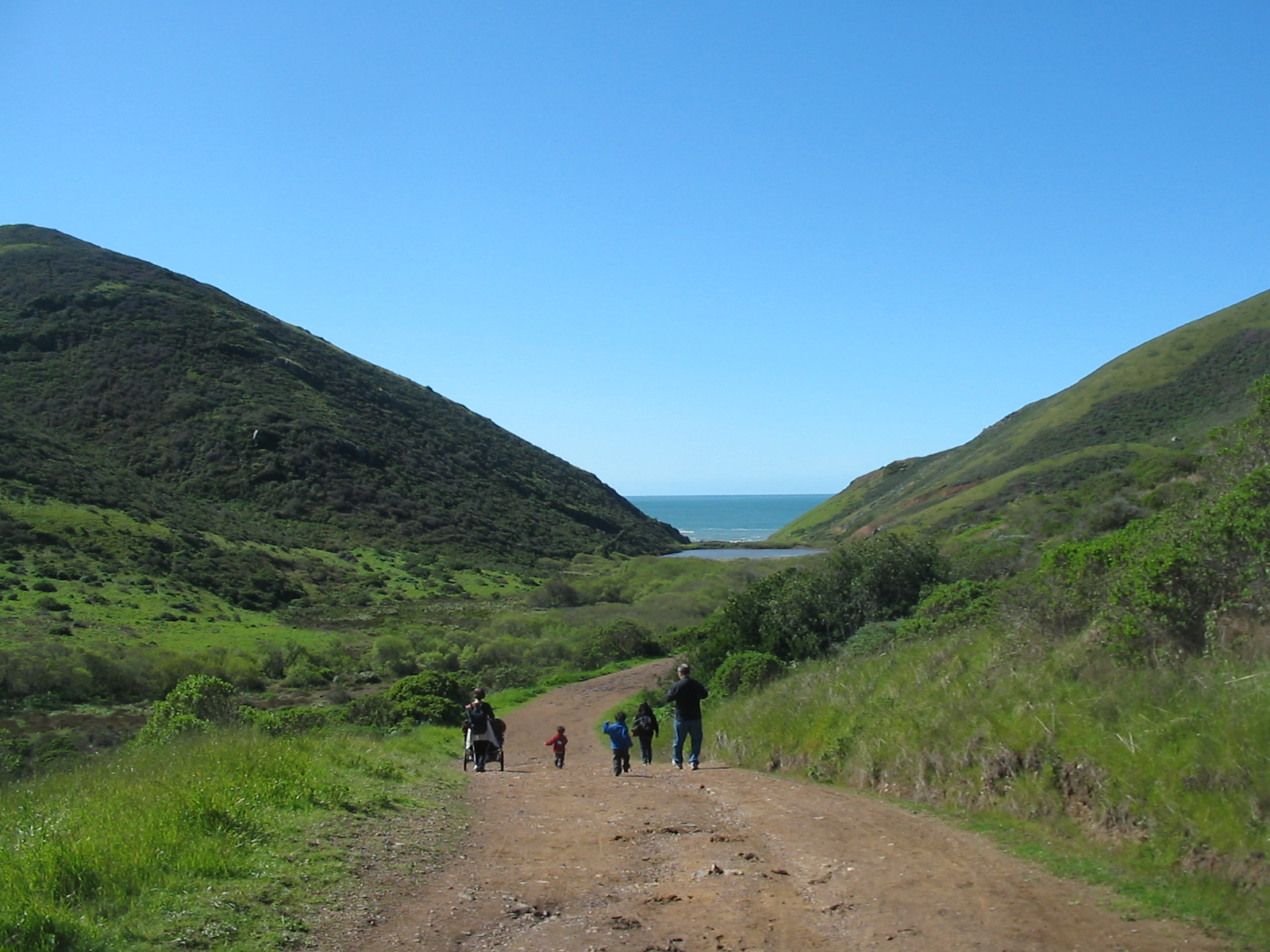
People walking on Tennessee Valley trail to the beach

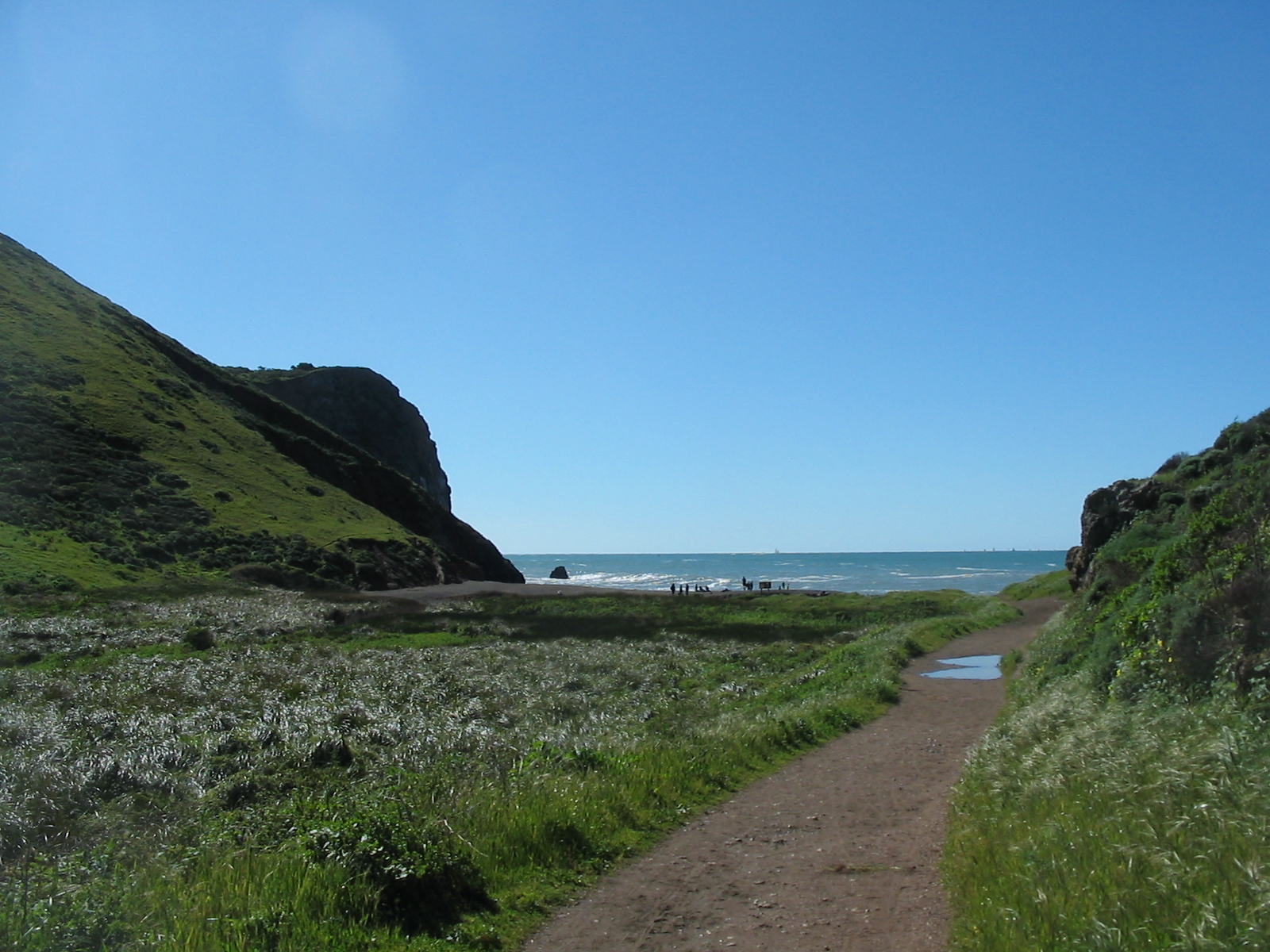
Tennessee Valley trail to the beach

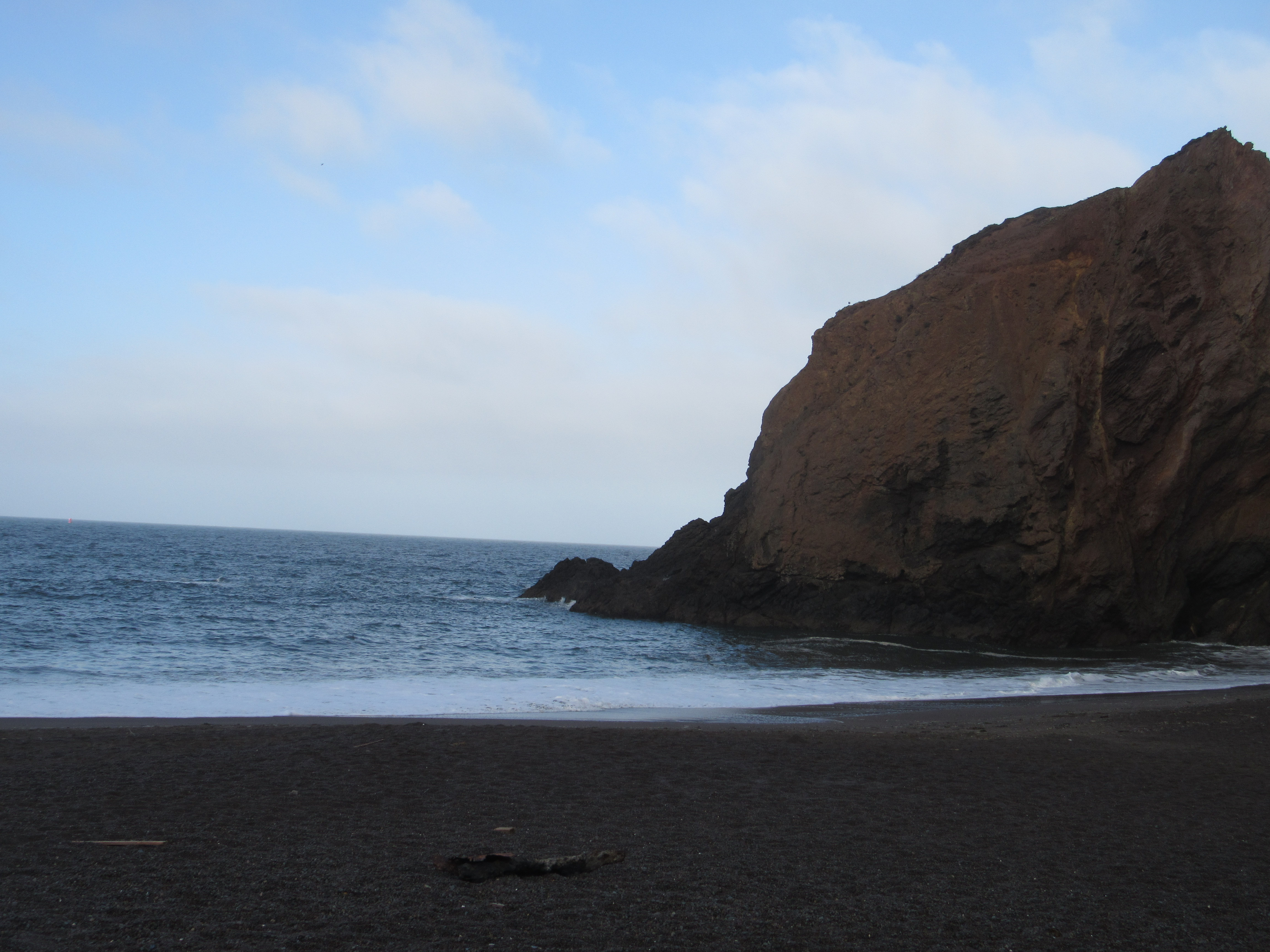
Tennessee Cove in 2021
