= Aenid (ship) =

Australian ship

History

New South Wales
- Name: Aenid
- Owner: Commodore Sir William Wiseman
- Fate: Wrecked 13 November 1865

General characteristics
- Type: Wooden cutter
- Crew: 6

Aenid was a wooden cutter belonging to Commodore William Wiseman, the commanding officer of the Australia Station. The vessel was wrecked at Long Reef, New South Wales, Australia on 13 November 1865, whilst carrying cargo between Sydney and Broken Bay.

== Wreck ==
Aenid left Farm Cove, New South Wales, at 8:00 p.m. on 12 November 1865, with the intention of visiting Brisbane Water. She stopped at Manly, New South Wales, along the way, and set off again at about 11:00 p.m. After clearing the Heads, she headed east for about three miles, then bore to the north. Herbert Meade, at the helm, gave leave for the rest of the crew to go to sleep, although James Clarke, the petty officer, remained on deck.

Clarke had the reputation of being a reliable seaman, and claimed to know the area well, so Meade allowed him to take the helm at about 1.30 a.m. Shortly afterward, spotting the approach of three huge waves on the starboard quarter, the two men shouted to rouse the crew and endeavored to bring the yacht's head round to clear the southern end of the wave, or at least to receive it bow foremost. Before the yacht rounded, the first wave struck, swamping the dingy that was towing astern. The second wave threw the yacht on her beam ends and carried away midshipman Fulgombe, and the third wave washed away everyone but Meade, who clung to the wreck for as long as he was able. Aenid was almost completely submerged, and all that could be seen above the water was the end of the square-sail yard and the rigging. Meade, pulled from the wreck by tidal currents, struck out for shore, where he was joined by three of his companions — Clarke and a seaman named Tilly were missing. Tilly's body was discovered two days later, close to the shore, but Clarke was never seen again. The yacht was later found washed up on Long Reef, with a portion of her broadside stove in.
