= MS München =

German LASH carrier that sank in 1978

- MS München

History

West Germany
- Name: München
- Namesake: City of Munich, Germany
- Owner: Hapag-Lloyd
- Operator: Hapag-Lloyd
- Route: Bremerhaven, Germany to Savannah, Georgia, U.S.
- Builder: Cockerill-Sambre
- Yard number: 860
- Launched: 12 May 1972
- In service: 22 September 1972
- Out of service: 12 December 1978
- Identification: IMO number: 7214856
- Fate: Lost in a storm in the North Atlantic on 12 December 1978

General characteristics
- Class & type: LASH carrier
- Tonnage: 37,134 GRT; 44,600 DWT
- Length: 261.4 m (857 ft 7 in)
- Beam: 32.2 m (105 ft 8 in)
- Height: 18.29 m (60 ft 0 in)
- Draught: 11.28 m (37 ft 0 in)
- Propulsion: 9 cylinder Sulzer 9 RND 90 diesel engine; 26,100 hp (19,500 kW) at 122 rpm; 5-bladed propeller
- Speed: 18 knots (33 km/h; 21 mph)
- Crew: 28

MS München was a German LASH carrier of the Hapag-Lloyd line that sank with all 28 hands for unknown reasons in a severe North Atlantic storm in December 1978. The most accepted theory is that one or more rogue waves hit München and damaged her, so that she drifted for 33 hours with a list of 50 degrees without electricity or propulsion.

== Early career ==
MS München was launched on 12 May 1972 at the shipyards of Cockerill Yards, Hoboken, Flanders, Belgium (Yard number 860) and delivered on 22 September 1972. München was a LASH ship and was the only ship of her kind under the German flag. She departed on her maiden voyage to the United States on 19 October 1972.

Her sister ship MS Bilderdijk was built for the Holland America Line also at the shipyards of Cockerill Yards, Hoboken, Belgium (Yard number 859). She sailed under the Dutch flag until 1986 when she was renamed Rhine Forest. This ship was retired from commercial operation on 15 December 2007. She was subsequently scrapped in Bangladesh.

== Last voyage and search operations ==
München departed the port of Bremerhaven on 7 December 1978, bound for Savannah, Georgia. This was her usual route, and she carried a cargo of steel products stored in 83 lighters and a crew of 28. She also carried a replacement nuclear reactor-vessel head for Combustion Engineering, Inc. This was her 62nd voyage, and took her across the North Atlantic, where a fierce storm had been raging since November. München had been designed to cope with such conditions, and carried on with her voyage. The exceptional flotation capabilities of the LASH carriers meant that she was widely regarded as being practically unsinkable.

München was presumed to be proceeding smoothly, until the night of 11–12 December. Between 00:05 and 00:07 (all times GMT) on 12 December, München's radio officer Jörg Ernst was overheard during a short radio communication on a "chat" frequency. He reported bad weather and some damage to München to his colleague Heinz Löhmann aboard MS Caribe, a German cruise ship 2,400 nautical miles (4,440 km) away. Ernst also transmitted München's last known position as 44°N 24°W. The quality of the transmission was bad, so that not everything was understood by Löhmann. Since it was a standard communication, the information was not relayed back to the ship's owner until 17 December.

=== Distress call ===
Around three hours later (03:10-03:20), SOS calls were received by the Greek Panamax freighter Marion, which relayed it to the Soviet passenger ship Mariya Yermolova and the German tug boat Titan. MS München gave her position as 46°15′N 27°30′W, which was probably around 100 nautical miles (200 km) off her real position. The messages were transmitted in Morse code and only parts of them were received. One fragment received was 50 degrees starboard, which could be interpreted as a 50-degree list to starboard.

Automatic emergency signals were also received by multiple radio stations starting at 04:43. No further calls were recorded after 07:34, probably because US stations stopped listening on the frequency 2182 kHz. At 17:30 on 12 December, international search and rescue operations were initiated and co-ordinated throughout by HM Coastguard at Land's End, Cornwall. Wind speeds of 11-12 Beaufort were reported in the area of the search, hampering efforts. The initial search requested by HMCG was by a Royal Air Force Hawker Siddeley Nimrod maritime reconnaissance aircraft, co-ordinated by SRCC RAF Mount Batten.

=== Initial search efforts and further communications ===
The next day, 13 December, an additional Lockheed C-130 Hercules aircraft from Germany and six ships searched for München. At 09:06 Michael F. Sinnot, a Belgian radio amateur in Brussels, received a voice transmission on the unusual frequency 8238.4 kHz, which is typically used by a radio station at Norddeich in Germany. The transmission was clear but interrupted by some noise, and contained fragments of München's name and callsign. Later in court, Sinnot reported that the voice was calm and spoke in English but with a distinct German accent. Since Sinnot only had a receiver for this frequency, he relayed the message via telex to a radio station in Ostend.

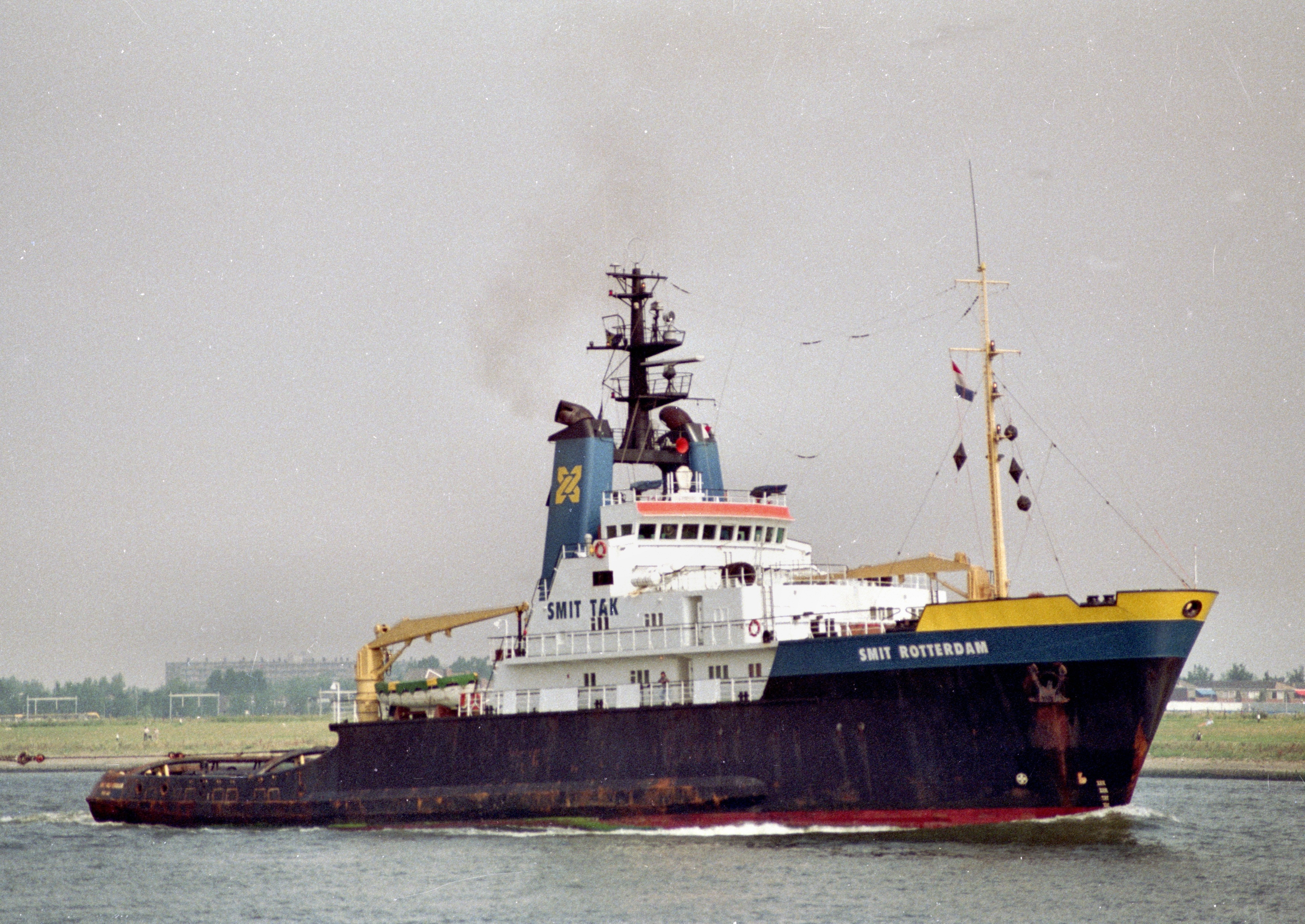
Tug Smit Rotterdam, 1987

Between 17:00 and 19:14, ten weak Mayday calls were received by the US Naval Station Rota, Spain at regular intervals, mentioning "28 persons on board". The messages may have been recorded and sent automatically. München's call sign, 'DEAT', which was sent in Morse code, was received three times on the same frequency. The Dutch ocean-going salvage tug Smit Rotterdam, which was returning from other Mayday calls in the Gulf of Breton and the English Channel, received the calls as well and went to the designated position under the command of Captain PF de Nijs. Lands End CG provided the search planning and areas to be covered and appointed the salvage tug Smit Rotterdam as Onscene Commander co-ordinating the activities of eventually more than 100 ships and also the 16 aircraft taking part all now temporarily based in the Azores.

=== The search intensifies ===
On 14 December, wind speeds dropped to Force 9. By that time, four aircraft and 17 ships were participating in the search operation. Signals of München's emergency buoy were received. At 19:00 the British freighter King George picked up an empty life raft at 44°22′N 24°00′W. The same day, Hapag-Lloyd's freighter Erlangen found and identified three of München's lighters. The following day, 15 December, a British Nimrod patrol aircraft discovered two orange objects shaped like buoys at 44°48′N 24°12′W and the salvage tug Titan recovered a second life raft. A third one was located at 44°48′N 22°49′W the next day by MS Badenstein; all were empty. A yellow barrel was also sighted that day.

On 17 December, at 13:00 Düsseldorf Express salvaged München's emergency buoy. By then, wind speeds had dropped to Force 3. The freighter Starlight found two life belts; at 43°25′N 22°34′W Sealand Consumer picked up a fourth empty life raft. In addition, three life vests were sighted, two of them by Starlight and another by Evelyn.

=== The search is called off ===
The international search operation officially ended in the evening of 20 December, a week after it had begun. The West German government and Hapag-Lloyd decided to search for two more days, with British and American forces supporting them. Altogether, 13 aircraft from the United Kingdom, the United States, Portugal and Germany, and nearly 80 merchant and naval ships had searched for München and her crew. On 16 February 1979, the car transporter Don Carlos salvaged the damaged starboard-side lifeboat of München, the last object discovered from her.

== Investigation ==
The subsequent investigation into the disappearance of München centred on the starboard lifeboat and in particular the forward block from which it had hung. The pins, which should have hung vertically, had been bent back from forward to aft, indicating the lifeboat hanging below it had been struck by a huge force, that had run from fore to aft of the ship, and had torn the lifeboat from its pins. The lifeboat normally hung 20 metres (66 ft) above the waterline. With the existence of rogue waves then considered so statistically unlikely as to be near impossible, the investigation finally concluded that the severe weather had somehow created an 'unusual event' that had led to the sinking of München.

As the science behind rogue waves was explored and more fully understood, it was accepted that not only did they exist, but that it was possible that they could occur in the deep ocean, such as in the North Atlantic. Investigators later returned to the question of München and considered the possibility that she had encountered a rogue wave in the storm that night. Whilst ploughing through the storm on the night of 12 December, she was suddenly faced with a wall of water, between 80 and 100 feet (24 and 30 m) high, looming out of the dark. München would have plunged into the trough of the huge wave, and before she could rise out of it, it collapsed onto her, breaking across her bow and superstructure, tearing the starboard lifeboat out of its pins and probably smashing into the bridge, breaking the windows and flooding her. Having lost her bridge and steering, she would probably have lost her engines. Unable to maintain her heading into the storm, she would have been forced broadside into the waves. She seems to have floated for a number of hours, during which the storm and inaccurate positioning prevented her from being located. The force of the waves then hulled or even capsized her; another rogue wave may have contributed to her distress. She would then have succumbed to the flooding and sunk within a short period.

As of present, München's wreck site remains undiscovered.

== Media coverage ==
The loss of München was featured in an edition of the BBC documentary series Horizon entitled "Freak Wave," which was first shown on 14 November 2002.

In 2003, the Science Channel created a documentary entitled Killer Waves which studied the disappearance of München and concluded that a rogue wave was the most likely cause of her loss.

== Contribution to case law ==
In 1981, the North Carolina Court of Appeals set a legal precedent that resulted from the loss of München. In Rheinberg-Kellerei GmbH v. Vineyard Wine Co. 281 S.E.2d 425 (N.C. Ct. App. 1981), the court heard that 620 cases of wine, destined for Wilmington, North Carolina, were lost when the ship foundered. Rheinberg-Kellerei GmbH, which had produced and sold the wine, sued its North Carolina wine distributor, Vineyard Wine Co., for the purchase price of the lost shipment.

The North Carolina Court of Appeals held, however, that the German wine producer could not recover the purchase price. It decided the sellers must bear the risk of loss when they fail to give "prompt notice" that the shipment has been dispatched (see FOB). Without "prompt notice" that the shipment has been sent, the buyers are denied the opportunity to protect their goods, for example by obtaining insurance, against the risk of any loss, damage or theft. This appellate case is used as an example in many U.S. legal textbooks to illustrate the administration of the Uniform Commercial Code.

This ruling did not ruin Rheinberg-Kellerei, who are still in business as of December 2025.
