= Manakov =

Manakov (Russian: Манаков) is a Russian masculine surname, its feminine counterpart is Manakova. It may refer to

- Gennadi Manakov (1950–2019), Russian cosmonaut
- Maria Manakova (born 1974), Russian-born Serbian chess player
- Marina Manakov (born 1969), Russian-born German chess player
- Viktor Manakov (disambiguation)

== See also ==
- Manakov system in physics
