= Optical rogue waves =

Experimental observation of optical rogue waves. Single-shot time traces for three different pump power levels (increasing from top to bottom) and corresponding histograms. Each time trace contains ~15,000 events. Rogue events reach intensities of at least 30–40 times the average value.

Optical rogue waves are rare pulses of light analogous to rogue or freak ocean waves. The term optical rogue waves was coined to describe rare pulses of broadband light arising during the process of supercontinuum generation—a noise-sensitive nonlinear process in which extremely broadband radiation is generated from a narrowband input waveform—in nonlinear optical fiber. In this context, optical rogue waves are characterized by an anomalous surplus in energy at particular wavelengths (e.g., those shifted to the red of the input waveform) or an unexpected peak power. These anomalous events have been shown to follow heavy-tailed statistics, also known as L-shaped statistics, fat-tailed statistics, or extreme-value statistics. These probability distributions are characterized by long tails: large outliers occur rarely, yet much more frequently than expected from Gaussian statistics and intuition. Such distributions also describe the probabilities of freak ocean waves and various phenomena in both the man-made and natural worlds. Despite their infrequency, rare events wield significant influence in many systems. Aside from the statistical similarities, light waves traveling in optical fibers are known to obey the similar mathematics as water waves traveling in the open ocean (the nonlinear Schrödinger equation), supporting the analogy between oceanic rogue waves and their optical counterparts. More generally, research has exposed a number of different analogies between extreme events in optics and hydrodynamic systems. A key practical difference is that most optical experiments can be done with a table-top apparatus, offer a high degree of experimental control, and allow data to be acquired extremely rapidly. Consequently, optical rogue waves are attractive for experimental and theoretical research and have become a highly studied phenomenon. The particulars of the analogy between extreme waves in optics and hydrodynamics may vary depending on the context, but the existence of rare events and extreme statistics in wave-related phenomena are common ground.

== History ==
Optical rogue waves were initially reported in 2007 based on experiments investigating the stochastic properties of supercontinuum generation from a train of nearly-identical picosecond input pulses. In the experiments, radiation from a mode-locked laser (megahertz pulse train) was injected into a nonlinear optical fiber and characteristics of the output radiation were measured at the single-shot level for thousands of pulses (events). These measurements revealed that the attributes of individual pulses can be markedly different from those of the ensemble average. Consequently, these attributes are normally averaged out or hidden in time-averaged observations. The initial observations occurred at the University of California, Los Angeles as part of DARPA-funded research aiming to harness supercontinuum for time-stretch A/D conversion and other applications in which stable white light sources are required (e.g., real-time spectroscopy). The study of optical rogue waves ultimately showed that stimulated supercontinuum generation (as described further below) provides a means of becalming such broadband sources.

Pulse-resolved spectral information was obtained by extracting wavelengths far from that of the input pulse using a longpass filter and detecting the filtered light with a photodiode and a real-time digital oscilloscope. The radiation can also be spectrally resolved with the time-stretch dispersive Fourier transform (TS-DFT), which produces a wavelength-to-time mapping such that the temporal traces collected for each event correspond to the actual spectral profile over the filtered bandwidth. The TS-DFT has subsequently been used to stretch the complete (unfiltered) output spectra of such broadband pulses, thereby allowing measurement of full pulse-resolved spectra at the megahertz repetition rate of the source (see below).

Pulse-resolved measurements showed that a fraction of the pulses had much more redshifted energy content than the majority of events. In other words, the energy passed by the filter was much larger for a small fraction of the events, and the fraction of events with anomalous energy content in this spectral band could be increased by raising the power of the input pulses. Histograms of this energy content showed heavy-tailed properties. In some scenarios, the vast majority of events had a negligible amount of energy within the filter bandwidth (i.e., below the measurement noise floor), while a small number of events had energies at least 30–40 times the average value, making them very clearly visible.

The analogy between these extreme optical events and hydrodynamic rogue waves was initially developed by noting a number of parallels, including the role of solitons, heavy-tailed statistics, dispersion, modulation instability, and frequency downshifting effects. Additionally, forms of the nonlinear Schrödinger equation are used to model both optical pulse propagation in nonlinear fiber and deep water waves, including hydrodynamic rogue waves. Simulations were then conducted with the nonlinear Schrödinger equation in an effort to model the optical findings. For each trial or event, the initial conditions consisted of an input pulse and a minute amount of broadband input noise. The initial conditions (i.e., pulse power and noise level) were chosen so that the spectral broadening was relatively limited in the typical events. Collecting the results from the trials, very similar filtered energy statistics were observed compared with those seen experimentally. The simulations showed that rare events had experienced significantly more spectral broadening than the others because a soliton had been ejected in the former class of events, but not in the vast majority of events. By applying a correlation analysis between the redshifted output energy and the input noise, it was observed that a particular component of the input noise was elevated each time a surplus in the redshifted noise was generated. The critical noise component has specific frequency and timing relative to the pulse envelope—a noise component that efficiently seeds modulation instability and can, therefore, accelerate the onset of soliton fission.

== Principles ==
=== Supercontinuum generation with long pulses ===
Supercontinuum generation is a nonlinear process in which intense input light, usually pulsed, is broadened into a wideband spectrum. The broadening process can involve different pathways depending on the experimental conditions, yielding varying output properties. Especially large broadening factors can be realized by launching narrowband pump radiation (long pulses or continuous-wave radiation) into a nonlinear fiber at or near its zero-dispersion wavelength or in the anomalous dispersion regime. Such dispersive characteristics support modulation instability, which amplifies input noise and forms Stokes and anti-Stokes sidebands around the pump wavelength. This amplification process, manifested in the time domain as a growing modulation on the envelope of the input pulse, then leads to the generation of high-order solitons, which break apart into fundamental solitons and coupled dispersive radiation. This process, known as soliton fission, occurs in supercontinuum generation pumped by both short or long pulses, but with ultrashort pulses, noise amplification is not a prerequisite for it to occur. These solitonic and dispersive fission products are redshifted and blueshifted, respectively, with respect to the pump wavelength. With further propagation, the solitons continue to shift to the red through the Raman self-frequency shift, an inelastic scattering process.

=== Fluctuations ===
Supercontinuum generation can be sensitive to noise. Especially with narrowband input radiation and large broadening factors, much of the spectral broadening is initiated by input noise, causing the spectral and temporal properties of the radiation to inherit substantial variability from shot-to-shot and to be highly sensitive to the initial conditions. These shot-to-shot variations normally go unnoticed in conventional measurements as they average over a very large number of pulses. Based on such time-averaged measurements, the spectral profile of the supercontinuum generally appears smooth and relatively featureless, whereas, the spectrum of a single pulse may be highly structured in comparison. Other effects such as dispersion management and polarization changes can also influence stability and bandwidth.

Both the pump power and input noise level are influential in the supercontinuum generation process, determining, e.g., the broadening factor and the onset of soliton-fission. Below the threshold for soliton fission, the soliton number generated from an average output pulse is below one, and well above threshold, it can be quite large. In the case of large pump power, soliton fission often has been compared to onset of boiling in a superheated liquid in that the transition begins rather suddenly and explosively. In short, supercontinuum generation amplifies the input noise, transferring its properties to macroscopic characteristics of the broadened pulse train. Many of the commercially available supercontinuum sources are pumped by long pulses and, therefore, tend to have relatively significant pulse-to-pulse spectral fluctuations.

Input noise, or any other stimulus, matching the timing of the sensitive portion of the pump envelope and the frequency shift of modulation instability gain experiences the largest amplification. The interplay between nonlinearity and dispersion creates a particular portion on the pump envelope where the modulation instability gain is large enough and the walk-off between the pump and growing modulation is not too rapid. The frequency of this sensitive window is generally substantially shifted from the input wavelength of the pump, especially if the pump is near the zero-dispersion wavelength of the fiber. Experimentally, the dominant source of such noise is typically amplified spontaneous emission (ASE) from the laser itself or amplifiers used to increase the optical power. Once the growing modulation becomes large enough, soliton fission begins suddenly, liberating one or more redshifted solitons, which travel much slower than the remnants of the original envelope and continue shifting to the red due to Raman scattering. A properly positioned detection filter can be used to catch anomalous occurrences, such as a rare soliton that has been liberated due to a small surplus in the key input noise component.

=== Non-Gaussian statistics ===
Non-Gaussian statistics arise due to the nonlinear mapping of random initial conditions into output states. For example, modulation instability amplifies input noise, which ultimately leads to soliton formation. Also, in systems displaying heavy-tailed statistical properties, random input conditions often enter through a seemingly insignificant, nontrivial, or otherwise-hidden variable. Such is generally the case for optical rogue waves; for example, they can begin from a specific out-of-band noise component, which is usually very weak and unnoticed. Yet, in the output states, these minor input variations can be magnified into large potential swings in key observables. The latter may, therefore, exhibit substantial fluctuations for no readily apparent reason. Thus, the appearance of extreme statistics is often striking not only because of their counterintuitive probability assignments, but also because they frequently signify a nontrivial or unexpected sensitivity to initial conditions. It is important to recognize that rogue waves in both optics and hydrodynamics are classical phenomena and, therefore, intrinsically deterministic. However, determinism does not necessarily indicate that it is straightforward or practical to make useful predictions. Optical rogue waves and their statistical properties can be investigated in numerical simulations with the generalized nonlinear Schrödinger equation, a classical propagation equation that is also used to model supercontinuum generation and, more generally, pulse propagation in optical fiber. In such simulations, a source of input noise is needed to produce the stochastic output variations. Frequently, input phase noise with a power amplitude of one photon per mode is employed, corresponding to shot noise. Yet, noise levels beyond the one-photon-per-mode level are generally more experimentally realistic and often needed.

Measurements of redshifted energy serve as a means of detecting the presence of rare solitons. Additionally, peak intensity and redshifted energy are well correlated variables in supercontinuum generation with low soliton number; thus, redshifted energy serves as an indicator of peak intensity in this regime. This may be understood by recognizing that for sufficiently small soliton number only rare events contain a well-formed soliton. Such a soliton has short duration and high peak intensity, and Raman scattering ensures that it is also redshifted relative to the majority of the input radiation. Even if more than one soliton occurs in a single event, the most intense one generally has the most redshifted energy in this scenario. The solitons generally have little opportunity to interact with other intense features. As previously noted, the situation at higher pump power is different in that soliton fission occurs explosively; soliton structures appear in number at essentially the same point of the fiber and relatively early in the propagation, allowing collisions to occur. Such collisions are accompanied by an energy exchange facilitated by third-order dispersion and Raman effects, causing some solitons to absorb energy from others, thereby creating the potential for anomalous spectral redshifts. In this situation, the anomalous occurrences are not necessarily tied to the largest peak intensities. In summary, rare solitons may be generated at low pump power or input noise levels, and these events can be identified by their redshifted energy. At higher power, many solitons are generated and simulations suggest that their collisions can also yield extremes in redshifted energy, although in this case, the redshifted energy and peak intensity may not be as strongly correlated. Oceanic rogue waves are also thought to arise from both seeding of modulation instability and collisions between solitons, as in the optical scenario.

Just above the soliton-fission threshold, where one or more solitons are liberated in a typical event, rare narrowband events are detected as deficiencies in redshifted energy. In this regime of operation, the pulse-resolved redshifted energy follows left-skewed heavy-tailed statistics. These rare narrowband events are not generally correlated with reductions in components of the input noise. Instead, a rare frustration of spectral broadening occurs because noise components can seed multiple presolitonic features; thus, the seeds can effectively compete for gain within the pump envelope, and therefore, the growth is suppressed. Under various operating conditions (pump power level, filter wavelength, etc.), a wide variety of statistical distributions are observed.

=== Other conditions ===
Supercontinuum sources driven by ultrashort pump pulses (on the order of tens of femtoseconds in duration or less) are generally much more stable than those pumped by longer pulses. Even though such supercontinuum sources may make use of anomalous or zero dispersion, the propagation lengths are usually short enough that noise-seeded modulation instability has a less significant impact. The broadband nature of the input radiation makes it such that octave-spanning supercontinua can be achieved with relatively modest broadening factors. Even so, the noise dynamics of such sources can still be nontrivial, though they are generally stable and can be suitable for precision time-resolved measurements and frequency metrology. Nevertheless, soliton timing jitter in supercontinuum generation with 100 fs pulses has also been traced to input noise amplification by modulation instability, and L-shaped statistics in filtered energy have been observed in supercontinuum sources driven by such pulses. Extreme statistics have also been observed with pumping in the normal dispersion regime, wherein modulation instability occurs due to the contribution of higher-order dispersion.

=== Turbulence and breathers ===
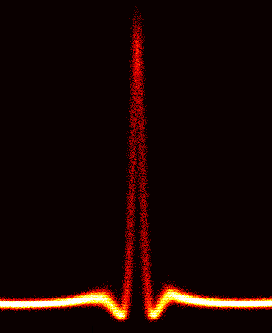
Peregrine soliton in optics

Wave turbulence or convective instability induced by third-order dispersion and/or Raman scattering have also been employed to describe the formation of optical rogue waves. Third-order dispersion and Raman scattering play a central role in the generation of large redshifts, and turbulence treats the statistical properties of weakly-coupled waves with randomized relative phases. Another theoretical description focused on analytical methodology has examined periodic nonlinear waves known as breathers. These structures provide a means of investigating modulation instability and are solitonic in nature. The Peregrine soliton, a specific breather solution, has attracted attention as a possible type of rogue wave that may have significance in optics and hydrodynamics, and this solution has been observed experimentally in both contexts. Yet, the stochastic nature of rogue waves in optics and hydrodynamics is one of their defining features, but remains an open question for these solutions as well as other postulated analytic forms.

=== Extreme events in beam filamentation ===
Extreme phenomena have been observed in single-shot studies of the temporal dynamics of optical beam filamentation in air and the two-dimensional transverse profiles of beams forming multiple filaments in a nonlinear Xenon cell. In the former studies, spectral analysis of self-guided optical filaments, which were generated with pulses close to the critical power for filamentation in air, showed that the shot-to-shot statistics become heavy-tailed at the short wavelength and long wavelength edges of the spectrum. Termed optical rogue wave statistics, this behavior was studied in simulations, which supported an explanation based on pump noise transfer by self-phase modulation. In the latter experimental study, filaments of extreme intensity described as optical rogue waves were observed to emerge due to mergers between filament strings when multiple filaments are generated. In contrast, the statistical properties were found to be approximately Gaussian for low filament numbers. It was noted that extreme spatio-temporal events are found only in certain nonlinear media even though other media have larger nonlinear responses, and the experimental findings suggested that laser-induced thermodynamic fluctuations within the nonlinear medium are the origin of the extreme events observed in multifilamention. Numerical predictions of extreme occurrences in multiple beam filamentation have also been performed, with some differences in conditions and interpretation.

== Stimulated supercontinuum generation ==
Supercontinuum generation is generally unstable when pumped by long pulses. The occurrence of optical rogue waves are an extreme manifestation of this instability and arise due to a sensitivity to a particular component of input noise. This sensitivity can be exploited to stabilize and increase the generation efficiency of the spectral broadening process by actively seeding the instability with a controlled signal instead of allowing it to begin from noise. The seeding can be accomplished with an extraordinarily weak, tailored optical seed pulse, which stabilizes supercontinuum radiation by actively controlling or stimulating modulation instability. Whereas noise-induced (i.e., spontaneously generated) supercontinuum radiation usually has significant intensity noise and little to no pulse-to-pulse coherence, controlled stimulation results in a supercontinuum pulse train with greatly improved phase and amplitude stability. Additionally, the stimulus can also be used to actuate the broadband output, i.e., to switch the supercontinuum on and off by applying or blocking the seed. The seed may be derived from the pump pulse by broadening a portion of it slightly and then carving out a stable portion of the broadened tail. The relative delay between the pump and seed pulses is then adjusted accordingly, and the two pulses are combined in the nonlinear fiber. Alternatively, the extremely stable stimulated supercontinuum can be generated by deriving both pump and seed radiation from a parametric process, e.g., the two-color output (signal and idler) of an optical parametric oscillator. Added input modulations have also been studied for changing the frequency of rare events and optical feedback can be employed to speed up the spectral broadening process. Stimulated supercontinuum radiation can also be generated using an independent continuous-wave seed, which avoids the need to control the timing but the seed must instead must have higher average power. A continuous-wave-seeded supercontinuum source has been employed in time stretch microscopy, yielding improved images compared with those obtained using unseeded sources. Stimulated supercontinuum generation can be slowed or frustrated by applying a second seed pulse with the proper frequency and timing to the mix. Thus, applying one seed pulse can accelerate the spectral broadening process, and the application of a second seed pulse can once again delay spectral broadening. This frustration effect occurs because the two seeds effectively compete for gain within the pump envelope, and it is a controlled version of the rare narrowband events known to occur stochastically in certain supercontinuum pulse trains (see above).

Stimulation has been harnessed for enhancing silicon-based supercontinuum generation at telecommunications wavelengths. Normally, spectral broadening in silicon is self-limiting because of strong nonlinear absorption effects: two-photon absorption and the associated free-carrier generation rapidly sap the pump, and increasing the pump power leads to more rapid depletion. In silicon nanowires, stimulated supercontinuum generation can greatly extend the broadening factor by circumventing the clamping effect of nonlinear loss, make broadening much more efficient, and yield coherent output radiation with the proper seed radiation.

== Pulse-resolved spectra ==
Complete single-shot spectral profiles of modulation instability and supercontinuum have been mapped into the time domain with the TS-DFT for capture at megahertz repetition rates. These experiments have been used to collect large volumes of spectra data very rapidly, permitting detailed statistical analyses of the underlying dynamics in ways that are exceedingly difficult or impossible to achieve with standard measurement techniques. Latent intrapulse correlations have been identified in modulation instability and supercontinuum spectra through such experiments. In particular, spectral measurements with the TS-DFT have been employed to reveal a number of key aspects of modulation instability in the pulsed (i.e., temporally-confined) scenario. Experimental data show that modulation instability amplifies discrete spectral modes, which exhibit mode asymmetry between Stokes and anti-Stokes wavelengths. Furthermore, the dynamics display prominent competition effects between these amplified modes, an interaction that favors domination of one mode over others. Such TS-DFT measurements have provided insights into the mechanism that often causes single patterns to dominate a given spatial or temporal region in the various contexts in which modulation instability appears. This type of exclusive mode growth is also influential in the initiation of optical rogue waves. Optically, these features become apparent in single-shot studies of pulse-driven modulation instability, but such effects are normally unrecognizable in time-averaged measurements due to inhomogeneous broadening of the modulation instability gain profile. The acquisition of a large number of such single-shot spectra also has a critical role in these analyses. This measurement technique has been used to measure supercontinuum spectra spanning an octave in bandwidth, and in such broadband measurements, rare rogue solitons have been observed at redshifted wavelengths. Single-shot spectral measurements with the TS-DFT have also recorded rogue-wave-like probability distributions caused by cascaded Raman dynamics in the process of intracavity Raman conversion in a partially mode-locked fiber laser.
