= Henk Jan Verhagen =

Dutch coastal engineer (born 1952)

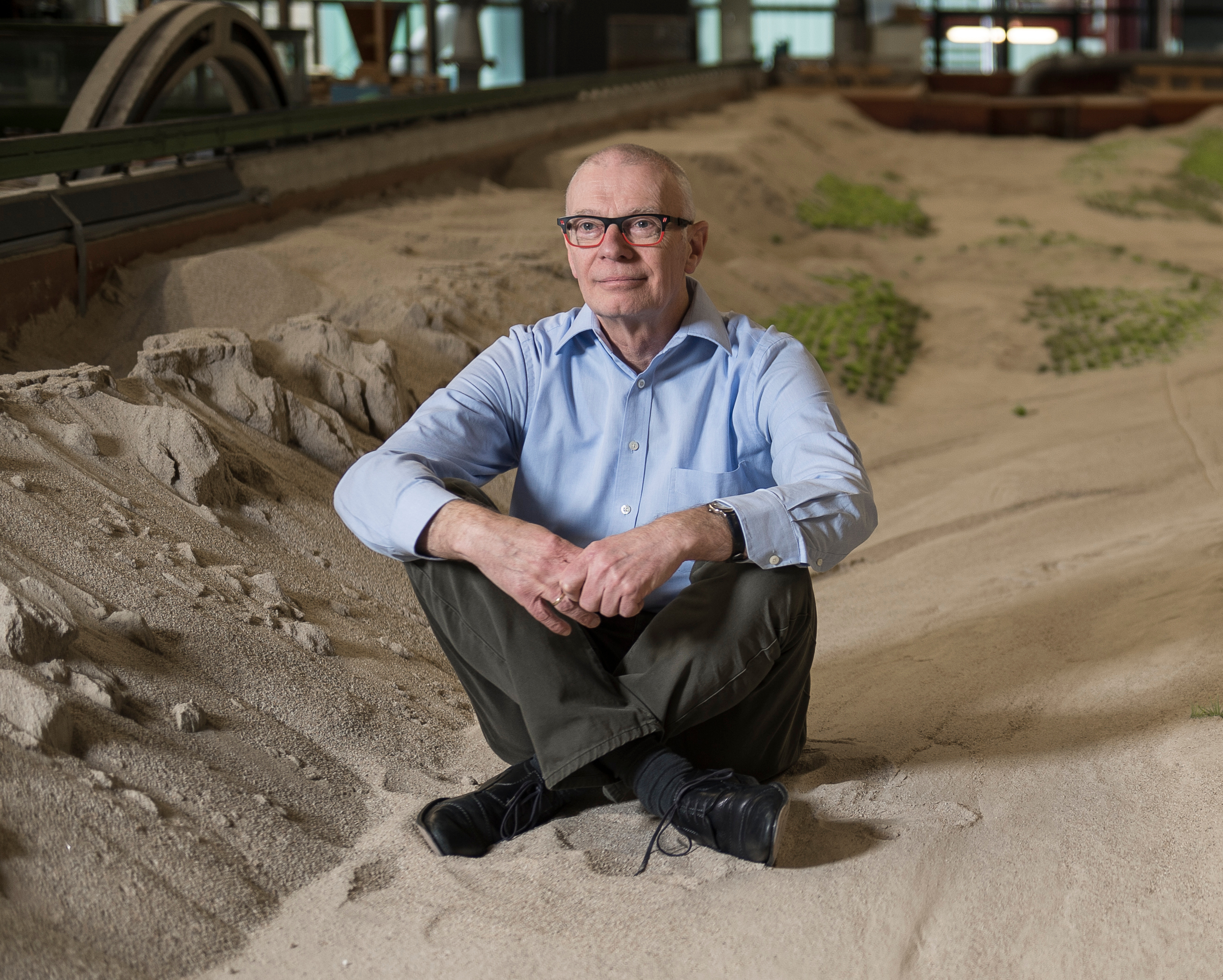
- Verhagen in the hydraulics laboratory at TU Delft (2017)
- Born: March 12, 1952 (age 74); Vlaardingen, Netherlands
- Known for: Research on rubble-mound breakwaters, bank protection and wave run-up; Dutch coastal defence policy (Kustverdediging na 1990; Basiskustlijn); Handboek Zandsuppleties; Contributions to the Rock Manual (closure works); PIANC Report 114 on pattern-placed revetment blocks

Academic background
- Education: Hogere Burgerschool (Nijmegen); ir. (civil engineering), Delft University of Technology (1978)
- Alma mater: Delft University of Technology

Academic work
- Discipline: Coastal engineering; Hydraulic engineering
- Institutions: Hydronamic (engineering arm of Boskalis); Rijkswaterstaat; IHE Delft Institute for Water Education; Delft University of Technology

Henk Jan Verhagen (born 12 March 1952) is a Dutch coastal engineer and civil engineer who has made contributions to the design of breakwaters and revetments, advised on Dutch and international coastal defence policy, and undertaken international collaboration in coastal engineering education and training in Indonesia and Vietnam.

After studying civil engineering at Delft University of Technology, Verhagen spent the early part of his career with Hydronamic and Rijkswaterstaat, along with teaching at the IHE Delft Institute for Water Education.

He was associate professor of coastal engineering at Delft University of Technology from 2000 to 2018, and has published widely on closure works, flood defence, breakwaters and revetments. His research work has included rubble-mound breakwaters, revetments and wave run-up. His involvement in Dutch coastal defence policy has included Kustverdediging na 1990 (Coastal Defence after 1990), a national policy framework that adopted dynamic preservation of the shoreline via sand nourishment, and introduced the national reference coastline, the Basiskustlijn (“basic coastline”). He was also involved with the creation of SWANOne, a GUI version of the wave modelling software SWAN.

He has authored and edited several books and papers including sections of the CIRIA Rock Manual, books on closure works and breakwaters, and PIANC reports.

== Career ==
=== Early career and research on crossing swell waves ===
After attending the Hogere Burgerschool in Nijmegen, Verhagen studied civil engineering at the Delft University of Technology (then the Technische Hogeschool Delft), graduating in 1978. During his time at Delft, Verhagen and Dik Ludikhuize carried out laboratory experiments to generate crossing monochromatic swell waves in a wave basin. Reporting their results in 1981, they found that the heights of individual waves from two intersecting wave trains could add linearly, producing combined crests that exceeded conventional wave breaking criteria even though each constituent train remained non-breaking. The work showed how crossing seas can momentarily produce higher crests than expected under single-direction conditions, a process later discussed in the context of rogue wave formation.

=== Industry ===
Verhagen began his career at Hydronamic, the engineering arm of Boskalis. He worked on the development of mathematical hydrodynamic models, applying them to the estuaries of the Tagus and the Douro in Portugal. He also researched the behaviour of ice floes on the Mackenzie River in Canada in support of the construction of artificial islands.

=== Rijkswaterstaat ===
In 1983 Verhagen joined Rijkswaterstaat, initially with the advisory service in Vlissingen. When that service was disbanded as the Delta Works neared completion, he moved to the Tidal Waters Division (Dienst Getijdewateren) in Middelburg. There he focused on improving dike revetments in the Eastern Scheldt, work made necessary by prolonged wave attack at a constant level during closure of the Oosterscheldekering. He also undertook studies on sandy coasts and the effectiveness of groynes.

In 1985 he transferred to the Directorate for Road and Hydraulic Engineering (Dienst Weg- en Waterbouwkunde). He served as a coordinator for the Technical Advisory Committee for Flood Defences (TAW), shaping the national research programme on flood defences for the 1990s. He contributed to the policy paper Kustverdediging na 1990 (Coastal Defence after 1990) by authoring technical reports including TR-7, TR-3 and TR-2. A key underpinning document in this period was the definition of the national coastal baseline (Basiskustlijn). He also wrote a series of articles on the basic principles of coastal engineering for the trade journal OTAR. During this period he co-authored Handboek Zandsuppleties with Krystian Pilarczyk.

=== UNESCO-IHE ===
In 1990 he moved to IHE in Delft, becoming head of the Hydraulic Engineering department and responsible for training coastal engineers from developing countries. He also chaired the TAW working group on the study of sandy coastlines. During this period he wrote lecture notes including Introduction to Coastal Engineering, Revetments, Sea-Dikes and River Levees, and Closure Works and, in collaboration with the authorities in Indonesia, helped set up in-service training for employees in hydraulic engineering at the Ministry of Public Works in Bandung. For this he co-authored a coastal engineering manual entitled Pedoman Teknik Pantai.

He also established a long-term collaboration with the Water Resources University in Hanoi (now Thuyloi University) to create a faculty of coastal engineering, teaching in Vietnam and supervising Vietnamese students in Delft. These projects continued after his move to TU Delft.

=== TU Delft ===
In 2000 Verhagen was appointed associate professor of Coastal Engineering at Delft University of Technology, where he lectured on topics including coastal and bank protection works. He taught courses including Bed, Bank and Shoreline Protection, Breakwaters and Closure Dams, and Coastal Zone Management, and organised an annual field course in Bulgaria. He expanded the accompanying textbooks, and a separate text on closure works was published. At TU Delft his research focused on the stability of rubble-mound bank protections and breakwaters, as well as wave run-up, much of it undertaken through MSc theses and presented at international conferences such as the ICCE and COPEDEC series. He chaired the Dutch steering group for the international Rock Manual and authored its chapter on the design of closure works, along with undertaking an updated edition of the engineering textbook Breakwaters and Closure Dams which was co-authored with Kees d'Angremond and Ferd van Roode.

Continuing his work in Indonesia and Vietnam, Verhagen also taught courses in Bangladesh, Colombia, South Africa and Argentina. For the Port of London he advised on sedimentation as part of an environmental impact assessment, and for HR Wallingford he prepared an assessment of computational and physical modelling for the Saemangeum closure works in South Korea. Representing the Netherlands, he served on the Maritime Navigation Commission of PIANC, and organised a survey on the desirability of guidelines in this field. He also authored PIANC Report 114, The Stability of Pattern Placed Revetment Blocks (2011).

=== Retirement ===
Verhagen retired in 2018. Since then he has been active in the Stichting Blauwe Lijn, where he helped establish the digital Trésor der Hollandse waterbouw (treasury of Dutch hydraulic engineering). He has also undertaken consultancy work, including coastal and harbour engineering works at Ward & Burke Construction Ltd. in Ireland.
