= Schrödinger field =

Physical fields obeying the Schrödinger equation

In quantum mechanics and quantum field theory, a Schrödinger field, named after Erwin Schrödinger, is a quantum field which obeys the Schrödinger equation. While any situation described by a Schrödinger field can also be described by a many-body Schrödinger equation for identical particles, the field theory is more suitable for situations where the particle number changes.

A Schrödinger field is also the classical limit of a quantum Schrödinger field, a classical wave which satisfies the Schrödinger equation. Unlike the quantum mechanical wavefunction, if there are interactions between the particles the equation will be nonlinear. These nonlinear equations describe the classical wave limit of a system of interacting identical particles.

The path integral of a Schrödinger field is also known as a coherent state path integral, because the field itself is an annihilation operator whose eigenstates can be thought of as coherent states of the harmonic oscillations of the field modes.

Schrödinger fields are useful for describing Bose–Einstein condensation, the Bogolyubov–de Gennes equation of superconductivity, superfluidity, and many-body theory in general. They are also a useful alternative formalism for nonrelativistic quantum mechanics.

A Schrödinger field is the nonrelativistic limit of a Klein–Gordon field.

== Summary ==
A Schrödinger field is a quantum field whose quanta obey the Schrödinger equation. In the classical limit, it can be understood as the quantized wave equation of a Bose Einstein condensate or a superfluid.

=== Free field ===
A Schrödinger field has the free field Lagrangian density

$$L = \psi^\dagger \left(i{\partial\over \partial t} + {\nabla^2 \over 2m}\right)\psi.$$

When $\psi$ is a complex valued field in a path integral, or equivalently an operator with canonical commutation relations, it describes a collection of identical non-relativistic bosons. When $\psi$ is a Grassmann valued field, or equivalently an operator with canonical anti-commutation relations, the field describes identical fermions.

Alternatively a symmetrizied Lagrangian density may be used. It varies by a total differential, and results in equivalent equations of motions but different momentum fields: $L = \frac{1}{2} \left( i\psi^\dagger \frac{\partial}{\partial t}\psi - i\psi\frac{\partial}{\partial t}\psi^\dagger \right) - {\nabla \psi^\dagger \nabla \psi\over 2m} = \psi^\dagger \Pi^\dagger + \psi \Pi - \mathcal{H}$

=== External potential ===
If the particles interact with an external potential $V(x)$, the interaction makes a local contribution to the action:

$$S = \int_{xt} \psi^\dagger \left(i{\partial \over \partial t} + {\nabla^2\over 2m}\right)\psi - \psi^\dagger(x) \psi(x) V(x).$$

The field operators obey the Euler–Lagrange equations of motion, corresponding to the Schrödinger field Lagrangian density:

$$\mathcal{L}=i\psi^{\dagger}\partial_{o}\psi -\frac{1}{2m}(\partial_i \psi^{\dagger} \partial^{i} \psi)-V\psi^{\dagger}\psi$$

Yielding the Schrödinger equations of motion:

$$\,\,i\partial_{o}\psi(x^{\mu}) = \left(\frac{-\Delta}{2m}+V(\vec{x})\right)\psi(x^{\mu})$$
$$-i\partial_{o}\psi^{\dagger}(x^{\mu}) = \left(\frac{-\Delta}{2m}+V(\vec{x})\right)\psi^{\dagger}(x^{\mu})$$

If the ordinary Schrödinger equation for V has known energy eigenstates $\phi_i(x)$ with energies $E_i$, then the field in the action can be rotated into a diagonal basis by a mode expansion:

$$\psi(x) = \sum_i \psi_i \phi_i(x).
\,$$

The action becomes:

$$S= \int_t \sum_i \psi_i^\dagger\left( i{\partial \over \partial t} - E_i\right) \psi_i
\,$$

which is the position-momentum path integral for a collection of independent Harmonic oscillators.

To see the equivalence, note that decomposed into real and imaginary parts the action is:

$$S= \int_t \sum_i 2\psi_r{d\psi_i\over dt} - E_i(\psi_r^2 + \psi_i^2)$$

after an integration by parts. Integrating over $\psi_r$ gives the action

$$S= \int_t \sum_i {1 \over E_i} \left(\frac{d\psi_i}{dt}\right)^2 - E_i \psi_i^2$$

which, rescaling $\psi_i$, is a harmonic oscillator action with frequency $E_i$.

=== Pair potential ===
When the particles interact with a pair potential $V(x_1,x_2)$, the interaction is a nonlocal contribution to the action:

$$S = \int_{xt} \psi^\dagger \left(i \frac{\partial}{\partial t} + {\nabla^2 \over 2m}\right)\psi - \int_{xy} \psi^\dagger(y) \psi^\dagger(x)V(x,y) \psi(x)\psi(y).$$

A pair-potential is the non-relativistic limit of a relativistic field coupled to electrodynamics. Ignoring the propagating degrees of freedom, the interaction between nonrelativistic electrons is the Coulomb repulsion. In 2+1 dimensions, this is:

$$V(x,y)= {j^2\over |y-x|}.$$

When coupled to an external potential to model classical positions of nuclei, a Schrödinger field with this pair potential describes nearly all of condensed matter physics. The exceptions are effects like superfluidity, where the quantum mechanical interference of nuclei is important, and inner shell electrons where the electron motion can be relativistic.

=== Nonlinear Schrödinger equation ===
A special case of a delta-function interaction $V(x_1,x_2) = \lambda \delta(x_1 - x_2)$ is widely studied, and is known as the nonlinear Schrödinger equation. Because the interactions always happen when two particles occupy the same point, the action for the nonlinear Schrödinger equation is local:

$$S =  \int_x \psi^\dagger \left(i{\partial \over \partial t} + {\nabla^2 \over 2m}\right)\psi + \lambda \int_x \psi^\dagger\psi^\dagger \psi\psi$$

The interaction strength $\lambda$ requires renormalization in dimensions higher than 2 and in two dimensions it has logarithmic divergence. In any dimensions, and even with power-law divergence, the theory is well defined. If the particles are fermions, the interaction vanishes.

=== Many-body potentials ===
The potentials can include many-body contributions. The interacting Lagrangian is then:

$$L_i = \int_x \psi^\dagger(x_1)\psi^\dagger(x_2)\cdots\psi^\dagger(x_n) V(x_1,x_2,\dots,x_n)\psi(x_1)\psi(x_2)\cdots\psi(x_n).\,$$

These types of potentials are important in some effective descriptions of close-packed atoms. Higher order interactions are less and less important.

=== Canonical formalism ===
The canonical momentum association with the field $\psi$ is

$$\Pi(x) = i \psi^\dagger.
\,$$

The canonical commutation relations are like an independent harmonic oscillator at each point:

$$[\psi(x), \psi^\dagger (y)] = \delta(x-y) \iff [\psi(x), \Pi(x)] = i\delta(x-y).$$

Note that the classical Lagrangian of Schrodinger field is singular and hence requires the use of Dirac brackets instead of Poisson brackets. Dirac brackets makes use of constraints that arise in singular Lagrangians and gives non-standard relations between the dynamical variables, which are then used in quantization instead of Poisson bracket relations. Despite the relation, $[\psi(x), \psi^\dagger (y)] = \delta(x-y)$ contradicting the corresponding Poisson bracket of fields due to treatment of $\psi(x),\psi^*(x)$ as independent fields through Wirtinger calculus, a consistent evaluation is obtained in Dirac brackets. Hamiltonian relations will remain of the same form but with Dirac brackets instead of Poisson brackets.

The canonical momentum associated with the conjugate field $\psi^\dagger$ vanishes in the regular form. The symmetric Lagrangian yields $\Pi (x) = \frac{i}{2} \psi^\dagger$ and $\Pi^\dagger (x) = -\frac{i}{2} \psi$.

The field Hamiltonian is

$$H = S - \int \Pi(x) {d\over dt}\psi = \int {|\nabla \psi|^2 \over 2m} + \int_{xy} \psi^\dagger(x)\psi^\dagger(y)V(x,y)\psi(x)\psi(y)
\,$$

and the field equation for any interaction is a nonlinear and nonlocal version of the Schrödinger equation. For pairwise interactions:

$$i{\partial \over \partial t} \psi = -{\nabla^2\over 2m} \psi + \left(\int_y V(x,y)\psi^\dagger(y)\psi(y)\right) \psi(x).
\,$$

=== Perturbation theory ===
The expansion in Feynman diagrams is called many-body perturbation theory. The propagator is

$$G(k) = {1 \over i\omega - {k^2\over 2m} }.
\,$$

The interaction vertex is the Fourier transform of the pair-potential. In all the interactions, the number of incoming and outgoing lines is equal.

== Exposition ==
=== Identical particles ===
The many body Schrödinger equation for identical particles describes the time evolution of the many-body wavefunction ψ(x_{1}, x_{2}...x_{N}) which is the probability amplitude for N particles to have the listed positions. The Schrödinger equation for ψ is:

$i\frac{\partial}{\partial t} \psi = \left( -\frac{\nabla_1^2}{2m} - \frac{\nabla_2^2}{2m} - \cdots - \frac{\nabla_N^2}{2m} + V(x_1,x_2,\dots,x_N) \right)\psi \,$

with Hamiltonian

$$H = \frac{p_1^2}{2m} + \frac{p_2^2}{2m} + \cdots + \frac{p_N^2}{2m} + V(x_1,\dots,x_N).
\,$$

Since the particles are indistinguishable, the wavefunction has some symmetry under switching positions. Either

1. $\psi(x_1, x_2, \dots) = \psi(x_2, x_1, \dots) \qquad\quad \text{for bosons}$,
2. $\psi(x_1, x_2,\dots) = -\psi(x_2,x_1, \dots) \qquad \text{for fermions}$.

Since the particles are indistinguishable, the potential V must be unchanged under permutations. If

$$V(x_1,\dots,x_N) = V_1(x_1)+ V_2(x_2) + \cdots + V_N(x_N)
\,$$

then it must be the case that $V_1=V_2=\cdots=V_N$. If

$$V(x_1 ... ,x_N) = V_{1,2}(x_1,x_2) + V_{1,3}(x_2,x_3) + V_{2,3}(x_1,x_2)
\,$$

then $V_{1,2} = V_{1,3} = V_{2,3}$ and so on.

In the Schrödinger equation formalism, the restrictions on the potential are ad-hoc, and the classical wave limit is hard to reach. It also has limited usefulness if a system is open to the environment, because particles might coherently enter and leave.

=== Nonrelativistic Fock space ===
A Schrödinger field is defined by extending the Hilbert space of states to include configurations with arbitrary particle number. A nearly complete basis for this set of states is the collection:

$$|N;x_1,\ldots,x_N\rangle
\,$$

labeled by the total number of particles and their position. An arbitrary state with particles at separated positions is described by a superposition of states of this form.

$$\psi_0 |0\rangle + \int_x \psi_1(x) |1;x\rangle + \int_{x_1x_2} \psi_2(x_1,x_2)|2;x_1 x_2\rangle + \ldots
\,$$

In this formalism, keep in mind that any two states whose positions can be permuted into each other are really the same, so the integration domains need to avoid double counting. Also keep in mind that the states with more than one particle at the same point have not yet been defined. The quantity $\psi_0$ is the amplitude that no particles are present, and its absolute square is the probability that the system is in the vacuum.

In order to reproduce the Schrödinger description, the inner product on the basis states should be

$$\langle 1;x_1|1;y_1\rangle = \delta(x_1-y_1)
\,$$

$$\langle 2;x_1 x_2 | 2;y_1 y_2\rangle = \delta(x_1-y_1)\delta(x_2-y_2) \pm \delta(x_1 -y_2)\delta(x_2-y_1)
\,$$

and so on. Since the discussion is nearly formally identical for bosons and fermions, although the physical properties are different, from here on the particles will be bosons.

There are natural operators in this Hilbert space. One operator, called $\psi^\dagger(x)$, is the operator which introduces an extra particle at x. It is defined on each basis state:

$$\psi^\dagger(x) \left|N;x_1 ,\dots, x_n\right\rangle = \left|N+1; x_1, \dots,x_n, x\right\rangle$$

with slight ambiguity when a particle is already at x.

Another operator removes a particle at x, and is called $\psi$. This operator is the conjugate of the operator $\psi^\dagger$. Because $\psi^\dagger$ has no matrix elements which connect to states with no particle at x, $\psi$ must give zero when acting on such a state.

$$\psi(x) \left|N; x_1, \dots ,x_N \right\rangle = \delta(x-x_1) \left|N-1;x_2,\dots,x_N\right\rangle + \delta(x-x_2)\left|N-1;x_1,x_3,\dots,x_N \right\rangle + \cdots$$

The position basis is an inconvenient way to understand coincident particles because states with a particle localized at one point have infinite energy, so intuition is difficult. In order to see what happens when two particles are at exactly the same point, it is mathematically simplest either to make space into a discrete lattice, or to Fourier transform the field in a finite volume.

The operator

$$\psi^\dagger(k)= \int_x e^{-ikx} \psi^\dagger(x)
\,$$

creates a superposition of one particle states in a plane wave state with momentum k, in other words, it produces a new particle with momentum k. The operator

$$\psi(k) = \int_x e^{ikx} \psi(x)
\,$$

annihilates a particle with momentum k.

If the potential energy for interaction of infinitely distant particles vanishes, the Fourier transformed operators in infinite volume create states which are noninteracting. The states are infinitely spread out, and the chance that the particles are nearby is zero.

The matrix elements for the operators between non-coincident points reconstructs the matrix elements of the Fourier transform between all modes:

1. $\psi^\dagger(k) \psi^\dagger(k') - \psi^\dagger(k')\psi^\dagger(k) =0 \,$
2. $\psi(k)\psi(k') - \psi(k')\psi(k) =0 \,$
3. $\psi(k)\psi^\dagger(k') - \psi(k')\psi^\dagger(k) = \delta(k-k') \,$

where the delta function is either the Dirac delta function or the Kronecker delta, depending on whether the volume is infinite or finite.

The commutation relations now determine the operators completely, and when the spatial volume is finite, there are no conceptual hurdle to understand coinciding momenta because momenta are discrete. In a discrete momentum basis, the basis states are:

$$|n_1, n_2, ... n_k \rangle
\,$$

where the n's are the number of particles at each momentum. For fermions and anyons, the number of particles at any momentum is always either zero or one. The operators $\psi_k$ have harmonic-oscillator like matrix elements between states, independent of the interaction:

$$\psi^\dagger(k)|\dots,n_k,\ldots\rangle = \sqrt{n_k+1}\, |\dots,n_k+1,\ldots\rangle$$

$$\psi(k) \left| \dots,n_k, \ldots \right\rangle = \sqrt{n_k} \left|\dots,n_k-1,\ldots \right\rangle$$

So that the operator

$$\sum_k \psi^\dagger(k)\psi(k) = \int_x \psi^\dagger(x)\psi(x)$$

counts the total number of particles.

Now it is easy to see that the matrix elements of $\psi(x)$ and $\psi^\dagger(x)$ have harmonic oscillator commutation relations too.

1. $[\psi(x),\psi(y)] = [\psi^\dagger(x),\psi^\dagger(y)] = 0$
2. $[\psi(x),\psi^\dagger(y)] = \delta(x-y)$

So that there really is no difficulty with coincident particles in position space.

The operator $\psi^\dagger(x) \psi(x)$ which removes and replaces a particle, acts as a sensor to detect if a particle is present at x. The operator $\psi^\dagger \nabla\psi$ acts to multiply the state by the gradient of the many body wavefunction. The operator

$$H= - \int_x \psi^\dagger(x) {\nabla^2 \over 2m } \psi(x)
\,$$

acts to reproduce the right hand side of the Schrödinger equation when acting on any basis state, so that

$$\psi^\dagger i{d\over dt} \psi = \psi^\dagger {-\nabla^2 \over 2m} \psi
\,$$

holds as an operator equation. Since this is true for an arbitrary state, it is also true without the $\psi^\dagger$.

$$i {\partial \over \partial t} \psi = {-\nabla^2 \over 2m} \psi
\,$$

To add interactions, add nonlinear terms in the field equations. The field form automatically ensures that the potentials obey the restrictions from symmetry.

=== Field Hamiltonian ===
The field Hamiltonian which reproduces the equations of motion is

$$H= {\nabla \psi^\dagger \nabla\psi \over 2m}$$

The Heisenberg equations of motion for this operator reproduces the equation of motion for the field.

To find the classical field Lagrangian, apply a Legendre transform to the classical limit of the Hamiltonian.

$$L = \psi^\dagger \left(i {\partial \over \partial t} + {\nabla^2 \over 2m} \right)\psi
\,$$

Although this is correct classically, the quantum mechanical transformation is not completely conceptually straightforward because the path integral is over eigenvalues of operators ψ which are not hermitian and whose eigenvectors are not orthogonal. The path integral over field states therefore seems naively to be overcounting. This is not the case, because the time derivative term in L includes the overlap between the different field states.

=== Relation to Klein–Gordon field ===
The non-relativistic limit as $c\to\infty$ of any Klein–Gordon field is two Schrödinger fields, representing the particle and anti-particle. For clarity, all units and constants are preserved in this derivation. From the momentum space annihilation operators $\hat{a}_\mathbf{p},\hat{b}_\mathbf{p}$ of the relativistic field, one defines

$$\hat{a}(x)=\int d\Omega_\mathbf{p}\hat{a}_\mathbf{p}e^{-i p\cdot x},\quad \hat{b}(x)=\int d\Omega_\mathbf{p}\hat{b}_\mathbf{p}e^{-i p\cdot x}$$,

such that $\hat\phi(x)=\hat a(x)+\hat b^\dagger(x)$. Defining two "non-relativistic" fields $\hat{A}(x)$ and $\hat{B}(x)$,

$$\hat{a}(x)=\frac{e^{-i m c^2 t/\hbar}}{\sqrt{2mc^2}}\hat{A}(x),\quad \hat{b}(x)=\frac{e^{-i m c^2 t/\hbar}}{\sqrt{2mc^2}}\hat{B}(x)$$,

which factor out a rapidly oscillating phase due to the rest mass plus a vestige of the relativistic measure, the Lagrangian density $L = (\hbar c)^2\partial_\mu\phi\partial^\mu\phi^\dagger - (mc^2)^2\phi\phi^\dagger$ becomes

$$\begin{align}
L
&= \left(\hbar c\right)^2 \left(\partial_\mu\hat{a}\partial^\mu\hat{a}^\dagger + \partial_\mu\hat{b}\partial^\mu\hat{b}^\dagger + \cdots\right) - \left(mc^2\right)^2\left(\hat{a}\hat{a}^\dagger + \hat{b}\hat{b}^\dagger + \cdots\right) \\
&= \frac{1}{2mc^2}\left[\left(\hbar c\right)^2\left(\frac{-imc}{\hbar}\hat{A} + \partial_0\hat{A}\right) \left(\frac{imc}{\hbar}\hat{A}^\dagger + \partial^0\hat{A}^\dagger\right) - \left(\hbar c\right)^2\partial_x\hat{A}\partial^x\hat{A}^\dagger + (A\Rightarrow B) + \cdots - \left(mc^2\right)^2\left(\hat{A}\hat{A}^\dagger + \hat{B}\hat{B}^\dagger + \cdots\right)\right] \\
&= \frac{\hbar^2}{2m}\left[ \frac{imc}{\hbar} \left(\partial_0\hat{A}\hat{A}^\dagger-\hat{A}\partial^0\hat{A}^\dagger\right) +
\partial_\mu\hat{A} \partial^\mu\hat{A}^\dagger + (A\Rightarrow B) + \cdots
\right]
\end{align}$$

where terms proportional to $e^{\pm 2 i m c^2 t/\hbar}$ are represented with ellipses and disappear in the non-relativistic limit. (Note: $e^{\pm 2 i m c^2 t/\hbar}$ is a harmonic function oscillating very fast, compared to other terms, and its average value is zero. So, when integrating, its contributions may be neglected in comparison to other terms. Compare for example to $F(x) = \sin(x) + \sin(10 x )/10$.) When the four-gradient is expanded, the total divergence is ignored and terms proportional to ${1}/{c}$ also disappear in the non-relativistic limit. After an integration by parts,

$$\begin{align}
L_A
&= i\hbar\hat{A}^\dagger\hat{A}' + \frac{\hbar^2}{2m}\left[\frac{1}{c^2}\hat{A}'{\hat{A}'}^\dagger - \partial_x\hat{A}\partial^x\hat{A}^\dagger \right] \\
&= i\hbar\hat{A}^\dagger\hat{A}' + \frac{\hbar^2}{2m} \left[ -\left(\partial_x\left(\hat{A}\,\partial^x\hat{A}^\dagger\right) - \hat{A}\,\partial_x\partial^x\hat{A}^\dagger\right) \right] \\
&= i\hbar\hat{A}^\dagger\hat{A}' + \frac{\hbar^2}{2m} \hat{A}\,\partial_x\partial^x\hat{A}^\dagger .
\end{align}$$

The final Lagrangian takes the form

$$L = \frac{1}{2}\left[
\hat{A}^\dagger \left(i\hbar\frac{\partial}{\partial t} + \frac{\hbar^2\nabla^2}{2m}\right)\hat{A}
+ \hat{B}^\dagger \left(i\hbar\frac{\partial}{\partial t}+ \frac{\hbar^2\nabla^2}{2m}\right)\hat{B}
+ \text{h.c.}
\right].$$
