= Peregrine soliton =

Analytic solution of the nonlinear Schrödinger equation

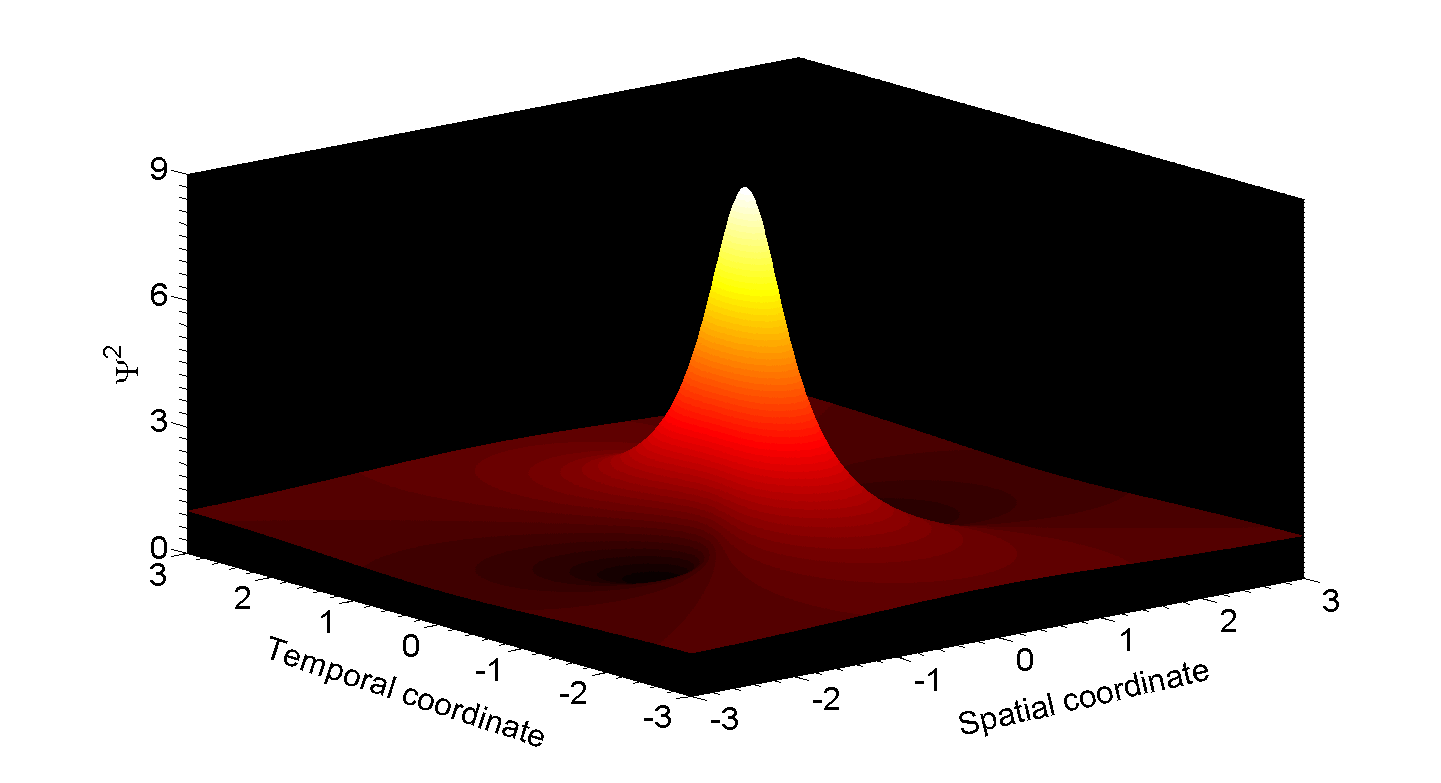
3D view of the spatio-temporal evolution of a Peregrine soliton

The Peregrine soliton (or Peregrine breather) is an analytic solution of the nonlinear Schrödinger equation. This soliton or breather solution was proposed in 1983 by Howell Peregrine, researcher at the mathematics department of the University of Bristol.

== Main properties ==
Contrary to the usual fundamental soliton that can maintain its profile unchanged during propagation, the Peregrine soliton presents a double spatio-temporal localization. Therefore, starting from a weak oscillation on a continuous background, the Peregrine soliton develops undergoing a progressive increase of its amplitude and a narrowing of its temporal duration. At the point of maximum compression, the amplitude is three times the level of the continuous background (and if one considers the intensity as it is relevant in optics, there is a factor 9 between the peak intensity and the surrounding background). After this point of maximal compression, the wave's amplitude decreases and its width increases.

These features of the Peregrine soliton are fully consistent with the quantitative criteria usually used in order to qualify a wave as a rogue wave. Therefore, the Peregrine soliton is an attractive hypothesis to explain the formation of those waves which have a high amplitude and may appear from nowhere and disappear without a trace.

== Mathematical expression ==
=== In the spatio-temporal domain ===
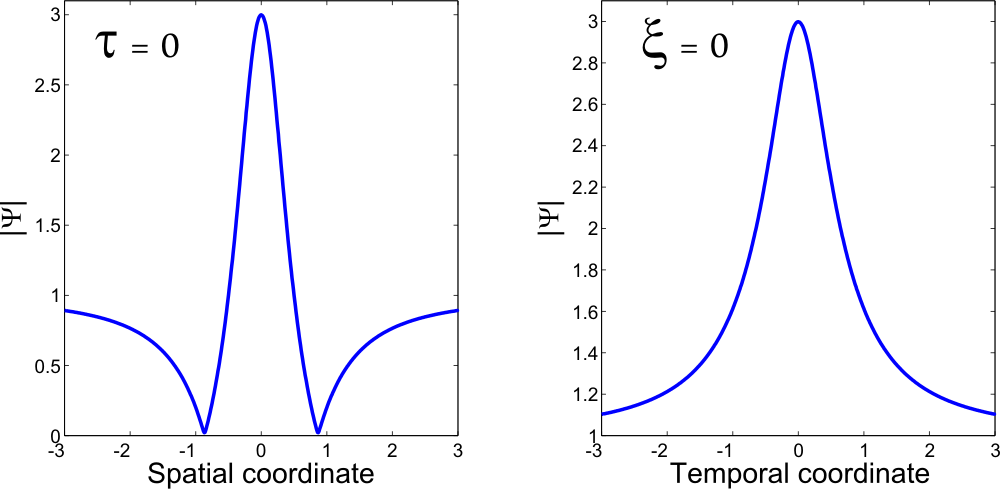
Spatial and temporal profiles of a Peregrine soliton obtained at the point of maximum compression

The Peregrine soliton is a solution of the one-dimensional nonlinear Schrödinger equation that can be written in normalized units as follows:

$i \frac{\partial \psi}{\partial \tau} + \frac{1}{2} \frac{\partial^2 \psi}{\partial \xi^2} + |\psi|^2 \psi = 0$

with $\xi$ the spatial coordinate and $\tau$ the temporal coordinate. $\psi (\xi, \tau)$ being the envelope of a surface wave in deep water. The dispersion is anomalous and the nonlinearity is self-focusing (note that similar results could be obtained for a normally dispersive medium combined with a defocusing nonlinearity).

The Peregrine analytical expression is:

$$\psi (\xi, \tau) =  \left[ 1-\frac{4 (1 + 2 i \tau)}{1+4 \xi^2 + 4 \tau^2}  \right] e^{i \tau}$$

so that the temporal and spatial maxima are obtained for $\xi = 0$ and $\tau = 0$.

=== In the spectral domain ===
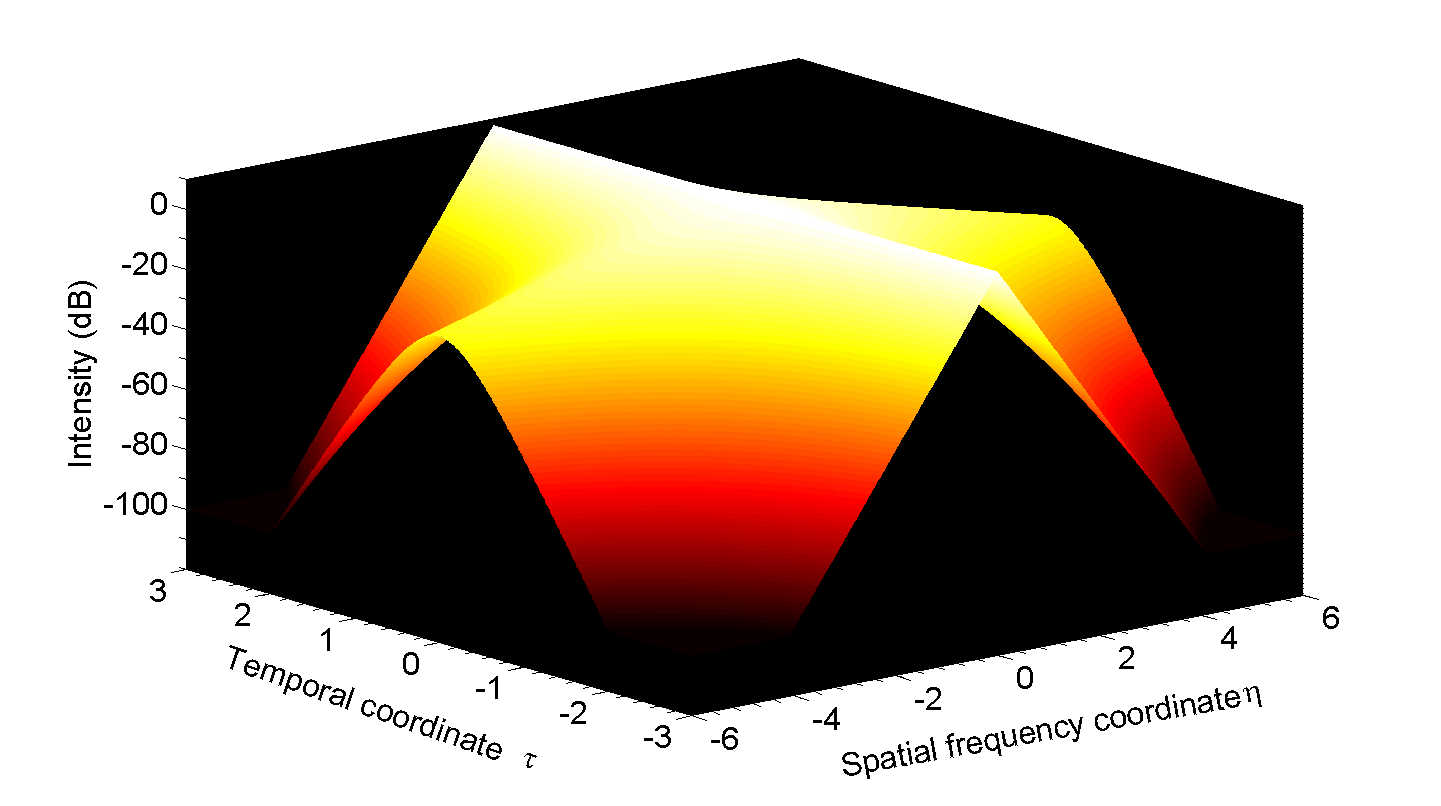
Evolution of the spectrum of the Peregrine soliton

It is also possible to mathematically express the Peregrine soliton according to the spatial frequency $\eta$:

$\tilde{\psi} (\eta, \tau) = \frac{1}{\sqrt{2 \pi}} \int{\psi (\xi, \tau) e^{i \eta \xi} d\xi} = \sqrt{2 \pi} e^{i \tau} \left[ \frac{1+2 i \tau}{\sqrt{1+4 \tau^2}} \exp \left( -\frac{|\eta|}{2} \sqrt{1+4 \tau^2} \right) - \delta(\eta) \right]$

with $\delta$ being the Dirac delta function.

This corresponds to a modulus (with the constant continuous background here omitted): $|\tilde{\psi} (\eta, \tau)| = \sqrt{2 \pi} \exp \left( -\frac{|\eta|}{2} \sqrt{1+4 \tau^2} \right).$

One can notice that for any given time $\tau$, the modulus of the spectrum exhibits a typical triangular shape when plotted on a logarithmic scale. The broadest spectrum is obtained for $\tau = 0$, which corresponds to the maximum of compression of the spatio-temporal nonlinear structure.

=== Different interpretations of the Peregrine soliton ===
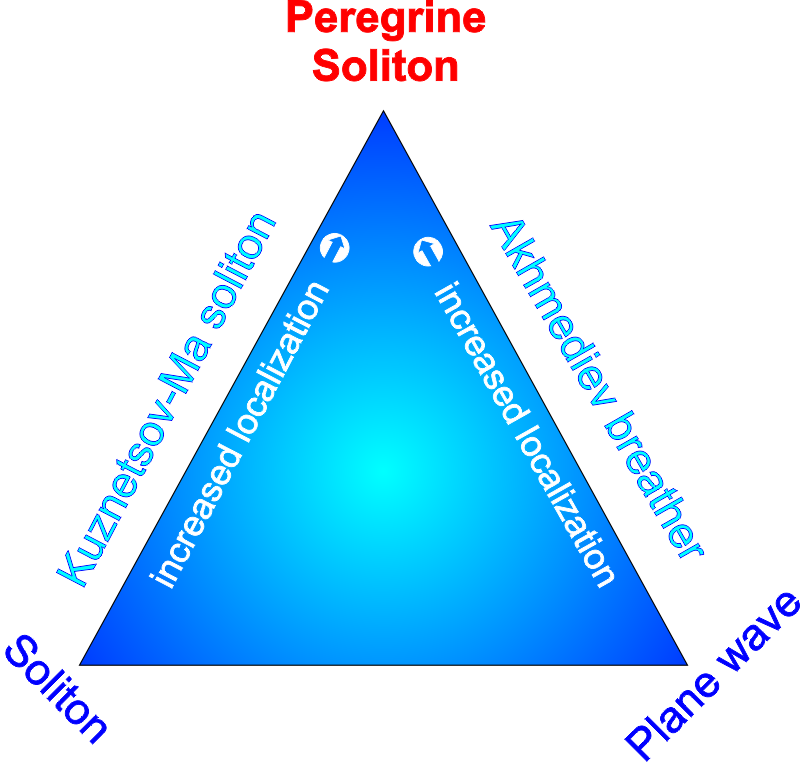
Peregrine soliton and other nonlinear solutions

==== As a rational soliton ====
The Peregrine soliton is a first-order rational soliton.

==== As an Akhmediev breather ====
The Peregrine soliton can also be seen as the limiting case of the space-periodic Akhmediev breather when the period tends to infinity.

==== As a Kuznetsov–Ma soliton ====
The Peregrine soliton can also be seen as the limiting case of the time-periodic Kuznetsov–Ma breather when the period tends to infinity.

== Experimental demonstration ==
Mathematical predictions by H. Peregrine had initially been established in the domain of hydrodynamics. This is however very different from where the Peregrine soliton has been for the first time experimentally generated and characterized.

=== Generation in optics ===
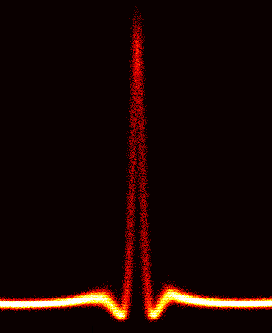
Record of the temporal profile of a Peregrine soliton in optics

In 2010, more than 25 years after the initial work of Peregrine, researchers took advantage of the analogy that can be drawn between hydrodynamics and optics in order to generate Peregrine solitons in optical fibers. In fact, the evolution of light in fiber optics and the evolution of surface waves in deep water are both modelled by the nonlinear Schrödinger equation (note however that spatial and temporal variables have to be switched). Such an analogy has been exploited in the past in order to generate optical solitons in optical fibers.

More precisely, the nonlinear Schrödinger equation can be written in the context of optical fibers under the following dimensional form:

$i \frac{\partial \psi}{\partial z} - \frac{\beta_2}{2} \frac{\partial^2 \psi}{\partial t^2 } + \gamma |\psi|^2 \psi = 0$

with $\beta_2$ being the second order dispersion (supposed to be anomalous, i.e. $\beta_2 < 0$) and $\gamma$ being the nonlinear Kerr coefficient. $z$ and $t$ are the propagation distance and the temporal coordinate respectively.

In this context, the Peregrine soliton has the following dimensional expression:

$$\psi (z,t) = \sqrt{P_0} \left[ 1-\frac{4  \left( 1 + 2 i  \dfrac{z}{L_{NL}}  \right) }{1+4   \left( \dfrac{t}{T_0} \right) ^2 + 4   \left( \dfrac{z}{L_{NL}} \right) ^2}  \right] e^{ \dfrac{i z}{L_{NL}}}$$.

$L_{NL}$ is a nonlinear length defined as $L_{NL} = \dfrac{1}{\gamma P_0}$ with $P_0$ being the power of the continuous background. $T_0$ is a duration defined as $T_0 = \sqrt{\beta_2 L_{NL}}$.

By using exclusively standard optical communication components, it has been shown that even with an approximate initial condition (in the case of this work, an initial sinusoidal beating), a profile very close to the ideal Peregrine soliton can be generated. However, the non-ideal input condition lead to substructures that appear after the point of maximum compression. Those substructures have also a profile close to a Peregrine soliton, which can be analytically explained using a Darboux transformation.

The typical triangular spectral shape has also been experimentally confirmed.

=== Generation in hydrodynamics ===
These results in optics have been confirmed in 2011 in hydrodynamics with experiments carried out in a 15-m long water wave tank. In 2013, complementary experiments using a scale model of a chemical tanker ship have discussed the potential devastating effects on the ship.

=== Generation in other fields of physics ===
Other experiments carried out in the physics of plasmas have also highlighted the emergence of Peregrine solitons in other fields ruled by the nonlinear Schrödinger equation.

== See also ==
- Nonlinear Schrödinger equation
- Breather
- Rogue wave
- Optical rogue waves
