= Nonlinear Schrödinger equation =

Nonlinear form of the Schrödinger equation

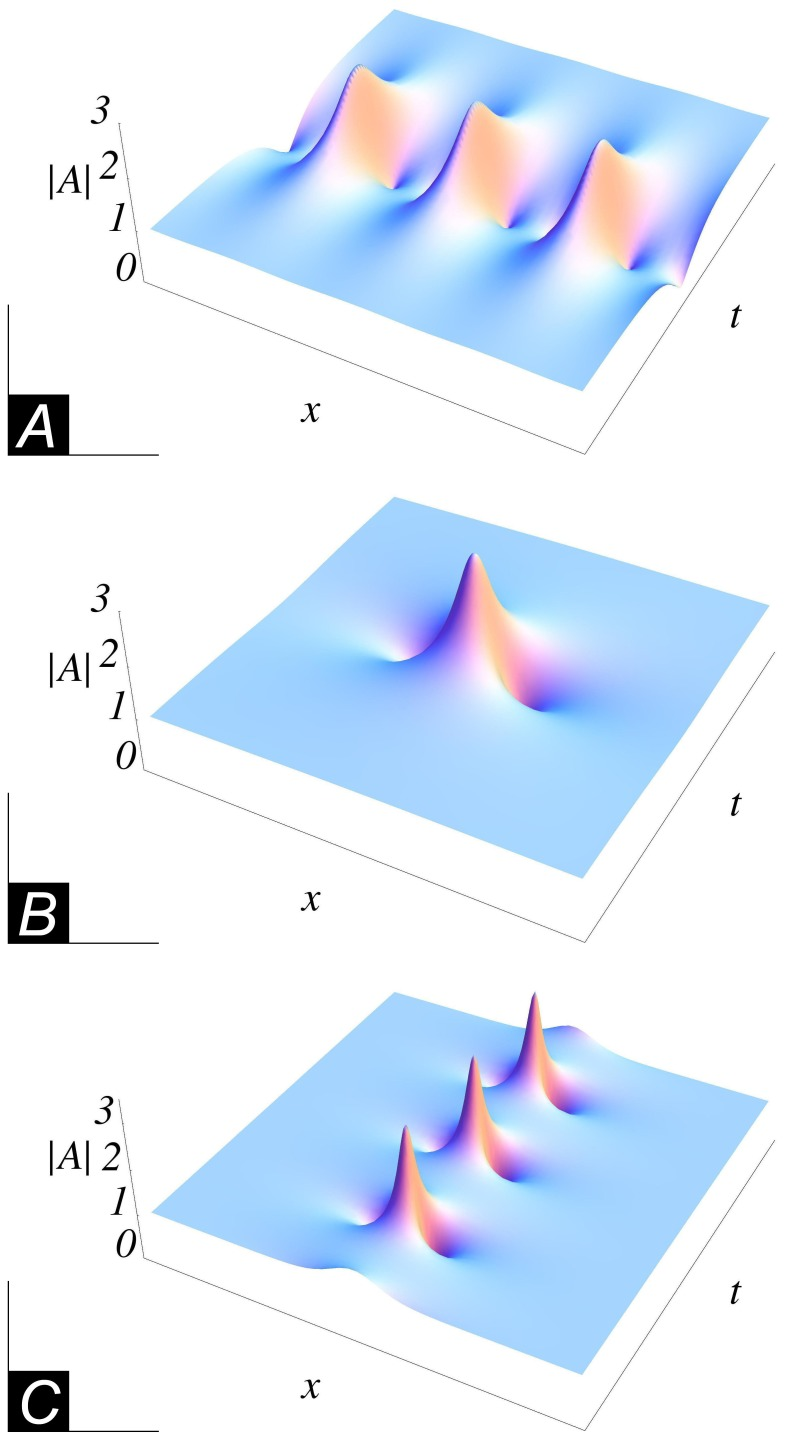
Absolute value of the complex envelope of exact analytical breather solutions of the nonlinear Schrödinger (NLS) equation in nondimensional form. (A) The Akhmediev breather; (B) the Peregrine breather; (C) the Kuznetsov–Ma breather.

In theoretical physics, the (one-dimensional) nonlinear Schrödinger equation (NLSE) is a nonlinear variation of the Schrödinger equation. It is a classical field equation whose principal applications are to the propagation of light in nonlinear optical fibers, planar waveguides and hot rubidium vapors and to Bose–Einstein condensates confined to highly anisotropic, cigar-shaped traps, in the mean-field regime. Additionally, the equation appears in the studies of small-amplitude gravity waves on the surface of deep inviscid (zero-viscosity) water; the Langmuir waves in hot plasmas; the propagation of plane-diffracted wave beams in the focusing regions of the ionosphere; the propagation of Davydov's alpha-helix solitons, which are responsible for energy transport along molecular chains; and many others. More generally, the NLSE appears as one of universal equations that describe the evolution of slowly varying packets of quasi-monochromatic waves in weakly nonlinear media that have dispersion. Unlike the linear Schrödinger equation, the NLSE never describes the time evolution of a quantum state. The 1D NLSE is an example of an integrable model.

In quantum mechanics, the 1D NLSE is a special case of the classical nonlinear Schrödinger field, which in turn is a classical limit of a quantum Schrödinger field. Conversely, when the classical Schrödinger field is canonically quantized, it becomes a quantum field theory (which is linear, despite the fact that it is called ″quantum nonlinear Schrödinger equation″) that describes bosonic point particles with delta-function interactions—the particles either repel or attract when they are at the same point. In fact, when the number of particles is finite, this quantum field theory is equivalent to the Lieb–Liniger model. Both the quantum and the classical 1D nonlinear Schrödinger equations are integrable. Of special interest is the limit of infinite strength repulsion, in which case the Lieb–Liniger model becomes the Tonks–Girardeau gas (also called the hard-core Bose gas, or impenetrable Bose gas). In this limit, the bosons may, by a change of variables that is a continuum generalization of the Jordan–Wigner transformation, be transformed to a system one-dimensional noninteracting spinless fermions.

The nonlinear Schrödinger equation is a simplified 1+1-dimensional form of the Ginzburg–Landau equation introduced in 1950 in their work on superconductivity, and was written down explicitly by R. Y. Chiao, E. Garmire, and C. H. Townes (1964, equation (5)) in their study of optical beams.

Multi-dimensional version replaces the second spatial derivative by the Laplacian. In more than one dimension, the equation is not integrable, it allows for a collapse and wave turbulence.

== Definition ==
The nonlinear Schrödinger equation is a nonlinear partial differential equation, applicable to classical and quantum mechanics.

=== Classical equation ===
The classical field equation (in dimensionless form) is:

Nonlinear Schrödinger equation (Classical field theory)

$i\partial_t\psi=-{1\over 2}\partial^2_x\psi+\kappa|\psi|^2 \psi$

for the complex field $\psi(x, t)$.

This equation arises from the Hamiltonian

$$H=\int \mathrm{d}x \left[{1\over 2}|\partial_x\psi|^2+{\kappa \over 2}|\psi|^4\right]$$

with the Poisson brackets

$$\{\psi(x),\psi(y)\}=\{\psi^*(x),\psi^*(y)\}=0 \,$$

$$\{\psi^*(x),\psi(y)\}=i\delta(x-y). \,$$

Unlike its linear counterpart, it never describes the time evolution of a quantum state.

The case with negative κ is called focusing and allows for bright soliton solutions (localized in space, and having spatial attenuation towards infinity) as well as breather solutions. It can be solved exactly by use of the inverse scattering transform, as shown by Zakharov & Shabat (1972) (see below). The other case, with κ positive, is the defocusing NLS which has dark soliton solutions (having constant amplitude at infinity, and a local spatial dip in amplitude).

=== Quantum mechanics ===
To get the quantized version, simply replace the Poisson brackets by commutators

$$\begin{align}
{}[\psi(x),\psi(y)]   &= [\psi^*(x),\psi^*(y)] = 0\\
{}[\psi^*(x),\psi(y)] &= -\delta(x-y)
\end{align}$$

and normal order the Hamiltonian

$$H=\int dx \left[{1\over 2}\partial_x\psi^\dagger\partial_x\psi+{\kappa \over 2}\psi^\dagger\psi^\dagger\psi\psi\right].$$

The quantum version was solved by Bethe ansatz by Lieb and Liniger. Thermodynamics was described by Chen-Ning Yang. Quantum correlation functions also were evaluated by Korepin in 1993. The model has higher conservation laws - Davies and Korepin in 1989 expressed them in terms of local fields.

== Solution ==
The nonlinear Schrödinger equation is integrable in 1D: Zakharov and Shabat (1972) solved it with the inverse scattering transform. The corresponding linear system of equations is known as the Zakharov–Shabat system:

$$\begin{align}
\phi_x &= J\phi\Lambda + U\phi \\
\phi_t &= 2J\phi\Lambda^2 + 2U\phi\Lambda + \left(JU^2 - JU_x\right)\phi,
\end{align}$$

where

$$\Lambda =
\begin{pmatrix}
\lambda_1&0\\
0&\lambda_2
\end{pmatrix}, \quad
J = i\sigma_z =
\begin{pmatrix}
i &  0 \\
0 & -i
\end{pmatrix}, \quad
U = i
\begin{pmatrix}
0 & q \\
r & 0
\end{pmatrix}.$$

The nonlinear Schrödinger equation arises as compatibility condition of the Zakharov–Shabat system:

$$\phi_{xt} = \phi_{tx}
\quad \Rightarrow \quad
U_t = -JU_{xx} + 2JU^2 U
\quad \Leftrightarrow \quad
\begin{cases}
iq_t =  q_{xx} + 2qrq \\
ir_t = -r_{xx} - 2qrr.
\end{cases}$$

By setting $q = r^*$ or $q = -r^*$ the nonlinear Schrödinger equation with attractive or repulsive interaction is obtained.

An alternative approach uses the Zakharov–Shabat system directly and employs the following Darboux transformation:

$$\begin{align}
\phi \to \phi[1] &= \phi\Lambda - \sigma\phi \\
U \to U[1] &= U + [J, \sigma] \\
\sigma &= \varphi\Omega\varphi^{-1}
\end{align}$$

which leaves the system invariant.

Here, φ is another invertible matrix solution (different from $\varphi$) of the Zakharov–Shabat system with spectral parameter $\Omega$:

$$\begin{align}
\varphi_x &= J\varphi\Omega + U\varphi \\
\varphi_t &= 2J\varphi\Omega^2 + 2U\varphi\Omega + \left(JU^2 - JU_x\right)\varphi.
\end{align}$$

Starting from the trivial solution $U = 0$ and iterating, one obtains the solutions with n solitons. This can be achieved via direct numerical simulation using, for example, the split-step method. This method has been implemented on both CPU and GPU.

== Applications ==
=== Fiber optics ===
In optics, the nonlinear Schrödinger equation occurs in the Manakov system, a model of wave propagation in fiber optics. The function ψ represents a wave and the nonlinear Schrödinger equation describes the propagation of the wave through a nonlinear medium. The second-order derivative represents the dispersion, while the κ term represents the nonlinearity. The equation models many nonlinearity effects in a fiber, including but not limited to self-phase modulation, four-wave mixing, second-harmonic generation, stimulated Raman scattering, optical solitons, ultrashort pulses, etc.

=== Water waves ===
A hyperbolic secant (sech) envelope soliton for surface waves on deep water. Blue line: water waves. Red line: envelope soliton.

For water waves, the nonlinear Schrödinger equation describes the evolution of the envelope of modulated wave groups. In a paper in 1968, Vladimir E. Zakharov describes the Hamiltonian structure of water waves. In the same paper Zakharov shows that, for slowly modulated wave groups, the wave amplitude satisfies the nonlinear Schrödinger equation, approximately. The value of the nonlinearity parameter к depends on the relative water depth. For deep water, with the water depth large compared to the wave length of the water waves, к is negative and envelope solitons may occur. Additionally, the group velocity of these envelope solitons could be increased by an acceleration induced by an external time-dependent water flow.

For shallow water, with wavelengths longer than 4.6 times the water depth, the nonlinearity parameter к is positive and wave groups with envelope solitons do not exist. In shallow water surface-elevation solitons or waves of translation do exist, but they are not governed by the nonlinear Schrödinger equation.

The nonlinear Schrödinger equation is thought to be important for explaining the formation of rogue waves.

The complex field $\psi$, as appearing in the nonlinear Schrödinger equation, is related to the amplitude and phase of the water waves. Consider a slowly modulated carrier wave with water surface elevation η of the form:

$$\eta = a(x_0,t_0)\; \cos \left[ k_0\, x_0 - \omega_0\, t_0 - \theta(x_0,t_0) \right],$$

where $a(x_0, t_0)$ and $\theta(x_0, t_0)$ are the slowly modulated amplitude and phase. Further $\omega_0$ and $k_0$ are the (constant) angular frequency and wavenumber of the carrier waves, which have to satisfy the dispersion relation $\omega_0 = \Omega(k_0)$. Then

$$\psi = a\; \exp \left( i \theta \right).$$

So its modulus $|\psi|$ is the wave amplitude $a$, and its argument $\arg(\psi)$ is the phase $\theta$.

The relation between the physical coordinates $(x_0, t_0)$ and the $(x, t)$ coordinates, as used in the nonlinear Schrödinger equation given above, is given by:

$$x = k_0 \left[ x_0 - \Omega'(k_0)\; t_0 \right], \quad t = k_0^2 \left[ -\Omega''(k_0) \right]\; t_0$$

Thus $(x, t)$ is a transformed coordinate system moving with the group velocity $\Omega'(k_0)$ of the carrier waves, The dispersion-relation curvature $\Omega''(k_0)$ – representing group velocity dispersion – is always negative for water waves under the action of gravity, for any water depth.

For waves on the water surface of deep water, the coefficients of importance for the nonlinear Schrödinger equation are:

$\kappa = - 2 k_0^2, \quad \Omega(k_0) = \sqrt{g k_0} = \omega_0 \,\!$ so $\Omega'(k_0) = \frac{1}{2} \frac{\omega_0}{k_0}, \quad \Omega''(k_0) = -\frac{1}{4} \frac{\omega_0}{k_0^2}, \,\!$

where g is the acceleration due to gravity at the Earth's surface.

In the original $(x_0, t_0)$ coordinates the nonlinear Schrödinger equation for water waves reads:

$$i\, \partial_{t_0} A + i\, \Omega'(k_0)\, \partial_{x_0} A + \tfrac12 \Omega''(k_0)\, \partial_{x_0 x_0} A - \nu\, |A|^2\, A = 0,$$

with $A=\psi^*$ (i.e. the complex conjugate of $\psi$) and $\nu=\kappa\, k_0^2\, \Omega''(k_0).$ So $\nu = \tfrac12 \omega_0 k_0^2$ for deep water waves.

=== Vortices ===
Hasimoto (1972) showed that the work of da Rios (1906) on vortex filaments is closely related to the nonlinear Schrödinger equation. Subsequently, Salman (2013) used this correspondence to show that breather solutions can also arise for a vortex filament.

== Symmetries ==
=== Scale invariance ===
The nonlinear Schrödinger equation is scale invariant in the following sense:

Given a solution $\psi(x, t)$ a new solution can be obtained by rescaling $\psi$, $x$ and $t$ by a function of a parameter $\alpha$:

$$\psi(x,t) \mapsto \psi_{[\alpha]}(x,t)=\alpha \psi(\alpha x,\alpha^2 t).$$

=== Galilean invariance ===
The nonlinear Schrödinger equation is Galilean invariant in the following sense:

Given a solution $\psi(x, t)$ a new solution can be obtained by replacing $x$ with $x + vt$ everywhere in $\psi(x, t)$ and by appending a phase factor of $e^{-iv(x+vt/2)}\,$:

$$\psi(x,t) \mapsto \psi_{[v]}(x,t)=\psi(x+vt,t)\; e^{-iv(x+vt/2)}.$$

== Gauge equivalent counterpart ==
NLSE (1) is gauge equivalent to the following isotropic Landau–Lifshitz equation (LLE) or Heisenberg ferromagnet equation

$$\vec{S}_t=\vec{S}\wedge \vec{S}_{xx}. \qquad$$

Note that this equation admits several integrable and non-integrable generalizations in 2 + 1 dimensions like the Ishimori equation and so on.

== Zero-curvature formulation ==
The NLSE is equivalent to the curvature of a particular $\mathfrak{su}(2)$-connection on $\mathbb{R}^2$ being equal to zero.

Explicitly, with coordinates $(x,t)$ on $\mathbb{R}^2$, the connection components $A_\mu$ are given by
$$A_x = \begin{pmatrix}i\lambda & i\varphi^* \\ i\varphi & -i\lambda\end{pmatrix}$$
$$A_t = \begin{pmatrix} 2i\lambda^2 - i|\varphi|^2 & 2i\lambda\varphi^* + \varphi_x^* \\ 2i\lambda\varphi - \varphi_x & -2i\lambda^2 + i|\varphi|^2\end{pmatrix}$$

Then the zero-curvature equation
$$\partial_t A_x - \partial_x A_t + [A_x, A_t] = 0$$

is equivalent to the NLSE $i\varphi_t + \varphi_{xx} + 2|\varphi|^2\varphi = 0$. The zero-curvature equation is so named as it corresponds to the curvature being equal to zero if it is defined $F_{\mu\nu} = [\partial_\mu - A_\mu, \partial_\nu - A_\nu]$.

The pair of matrices $A_x$ and $A_t$ are also known as a Lax pair for the NLSE, in the sense that the zero-curvature equation recovers the PDE rather than them satisfying Lax's equation.

== See also ==
- AKNS system
- Eckhaus equation
- Gross–Pitaevskii equation
- Quartic interaction for a related model in quantum field theory
- Soliton (optics)
- Logarithmic Schrödinger equation
