= Viktor Manakov =

Viktor Manakov may refer to:

- Viktor Manakov (cyclist, born 1960), Soviet cyclist
- Viktor Manakov (cyclist, born 1992), Russian cyclist
