= Breather =

Type of nonlinear wave in physics

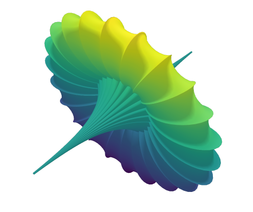
This breather pseudospherical surface corresponds to a solution of a non-linear wave-equation.

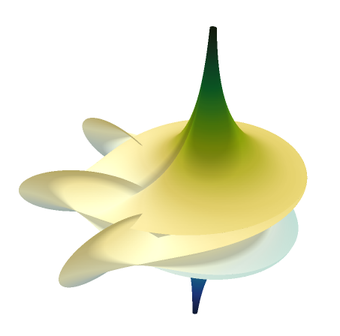
Pseudospherical breather surface

In physics, a breather is a nonlinear wave in which energy concentrates in a localized and oscillatory fashion. This contradicts with the expectations derived from the corresponding linear system for infinitesimal amplitudes, which tends towards an even distribution of initially localized energy. A discrete breather is a breather solution on a nonlinear lattice.

The term breather originates from the characteristic that most breathers are localized in space and oscillate in time, similar to breathing in living beings. This also apply in the opposite situation: oscillations in space and localized in time, which are also denoted as breathers.

== Overview ==
Sine-Gordon standing breather is a swinging in time coupled kink-antikink 2-soliton solution.

Large amplitude moving sine-Gordon breather.

A breather is a localized periodic solution of either continuous media equations or discrete lattice equations. The exactly solvable sine-Gordon equation and the focusing nonlinear Schrödinger equation are examples of one-dimensional partial differential equations that possess breather solutions. Discrete nonlinear Hamiltonian lattices in many cases support breather solutions.

Breathers are solitonic structures. There are two types of breathers: standing or traveling ones. Standing breathers correspond to localized solutions whose amplitude vary in time (they are sometimes called oscillons). A necessary condition for the existence of breathers in discrete lattices is that the breather main frequency and all its multipliers are located outside of the phonon spectrum of the lattice.

== Example of breather solutions ==
=== Sine-Gordon equation ===
The sine-Gordon equation is the nonlinear dispersive partial differential equation

$$\frac{\partial^2 u}{\partial t^2} - \frac{\partial^2 u}{\partial x^2} + \sin u = 0,$$

with the field u a function of the spatial coordinate x and time t.

An exact solution found by using the inverse scattering transform is:

$$u = 4 \arctan\left(\frac{\sqrt{1-\omega^2}\;\cos(\omega t)}{\omega\;\cosh(\sqrt{1-\omega^2}\; x)}\right),$$

which, for ω < 1, is periodic in time t and decays exponentially when moving away from x = 0.

=== Nonlinear Schrödinger equation ===
The focusing nonlinear Schrödinger equation is the dispersive partial differential equation:

$$i\,\frac{\partial u}{\partial t} + \frac{\partial^2 u}{\partial x^2} + |u|^2 u = 0,$$

with u a complex field as a function of x and t. Further i denotes the imaginary unit.

One of the breather solutions (Kuznetsov-Ma breather) is

$$u =
\left(
\frac{2 b^2 \cosh(\theta) + 2 i b \sqrt{2-b^2} \sinh(\theta)}
{2 \cosh(\theta)-\sqrt{2}\sqrt{2-b^2} \cos(a b x)} - 1
\right)a\,e^{i a^2 t}$$

with

$$\theta=a^2\,b\,\sqrt{2-b^2}\;t,$$

which gives breathers periodic in space x and approaching the uniform value a when moving away from the focus time t = 0. These breathers exist for values of the modulation parameter b less than √2. Note that a limiting case of the breather solution is the Peregrine soliton.

== See also ==
- Breather surface
- Soliton
