= Time stretching =

Time stretching may refer to:

- Audio time stretching and pitch scaling, in audio
- Time stretching, in video
- Time dilation, in physics (relativity theory)
- Time stretch analog-to-digital converter, in electronics
