= Time stretch dispersive Fourier transform =

Light technique

Time stretch dispersive Fourier transform (TS-DFT), otherwise known as time-stretch transform (TST), temporal Fourier transform or photonic time-stretch (PTS) is a spectroscopy technique that uses optical dispersion instead of a grating or prism to separate the light wavelengths and analyze the optical spectrum in real-time. It employs group-velocity dispersion (GVD) to transform the spectrum of a broadband optical pulse into a time stretched temporal waveform. It is used to perform Fourier transformation on an optical signal on a single shot basis and at high frame rates for real-time analysis of fast dynamic processes. It replaces a diffraction grating and detector array with a dispersive fiber and single-pixel detector, enabling ultrafast real-time spectroscopy and imaging. Its nonuniform variant, warped-stretch transform, realized with nonlinear group delay, offers variable-rate spectral domain sampling, as well as the ability to engineer the time-bandwidth product of the signal's envelope to match that of the data acquisition systems acting as an information gearbox.

== Operation principle ==
TS-DFT is usually adopted in a two step process. In the first step, the spectrum of an optical broadband pulse is encoded by the information (e.g., temporal, spatial, or chemical information) to be captured. In the next step, the encoded spectrum is mapped by large group-velocity dispersion into a slowed temporal waveform. At this point the waveform has been sufficiently slowed so it can be digitized and processed in real-time. Without the time stretch, single shot waveforms will be too fast to be digitized by analog to digital converters. Implemented in the optical domain, this process performs a similar function as slow motion used to see fast events in videos. While video slow motion is a simple process of playing back an already recorded event, the TS-DFT performs slow motion at the speed of light and before the signal is captured. When needed, the waveform is simultaneously amplified in the dispersive fiber by the process of stimulated Raman scattering. This optical amplification overcomes the thermal noise which would otherwise limit the sensitivity in real-time detection. Subsequent optical pulses perform repetitive measurements at the frame rate of the pulsed laser. Consequently, single shot optical spectra, carrying information from fast dynamic processes, can be digitized and analyzed at high frame rates. The time-stretch dispersive Fourier transformer consists of a low-loss dispersive fiber that is also a Raman amplifier. To create Raman gain, pump lasers are coupled into the fiber by wavelength-division multiplexers, with wavelengths of pump lasers chosen to create a broadband and flat gain profile that covers the spectrum of the broadband optical pulse. Instead of Raman amplification, a discrete amplifier such as an erbium doped optical amplifier or a semiconductor optical amplifier can be placed before the dispersive fiber. However, the distributed nature of Raman amplification provides superior signal to noise ratio. Dispersive Fourier Transform has proven to be an enabling technology for wideband A/D conversion (ultra wideband analog to digital converters) and has also been used for high-throughput real-time spectroscopy and imaging (serial time-encoded amplified microscopy (STEAM)).

== Relation to phase stretch transform ==
The phase stretch transform or pST is a computational approach to signal and image processing. One of its utilities is for feature detection and classification. Phase stretch transform is a spin-off from research on the time stretch dispersive Fourier transform. it transforms the image by emulating propagation through a diffractive medium with engineered 3D dispersive property (refractive index).

== Real-time single-shot analysis of spectral noise ==
Recently, PTS has been used to study of optical non-linearities in fibers. Correlation properties in both the spectral and temporal domains can be deduced from single-shot PTS data to study the stochastic nature of optical systems. Namely, modulation instability and supercontinuum generation in highly non-linear fiber have been studied.

== See also ==
- Frequency spectrum
- Least-squares spectral analysis
- Time stretch analog-to-digital converter
- Serial time-encoded amplified microscopy
