= Saint Petersburg Mathematical Society =

- Санкт-Петербургское математическое общество
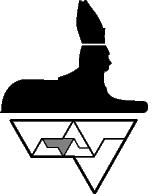
- Logo of the Saint Petersburg Mathematical society

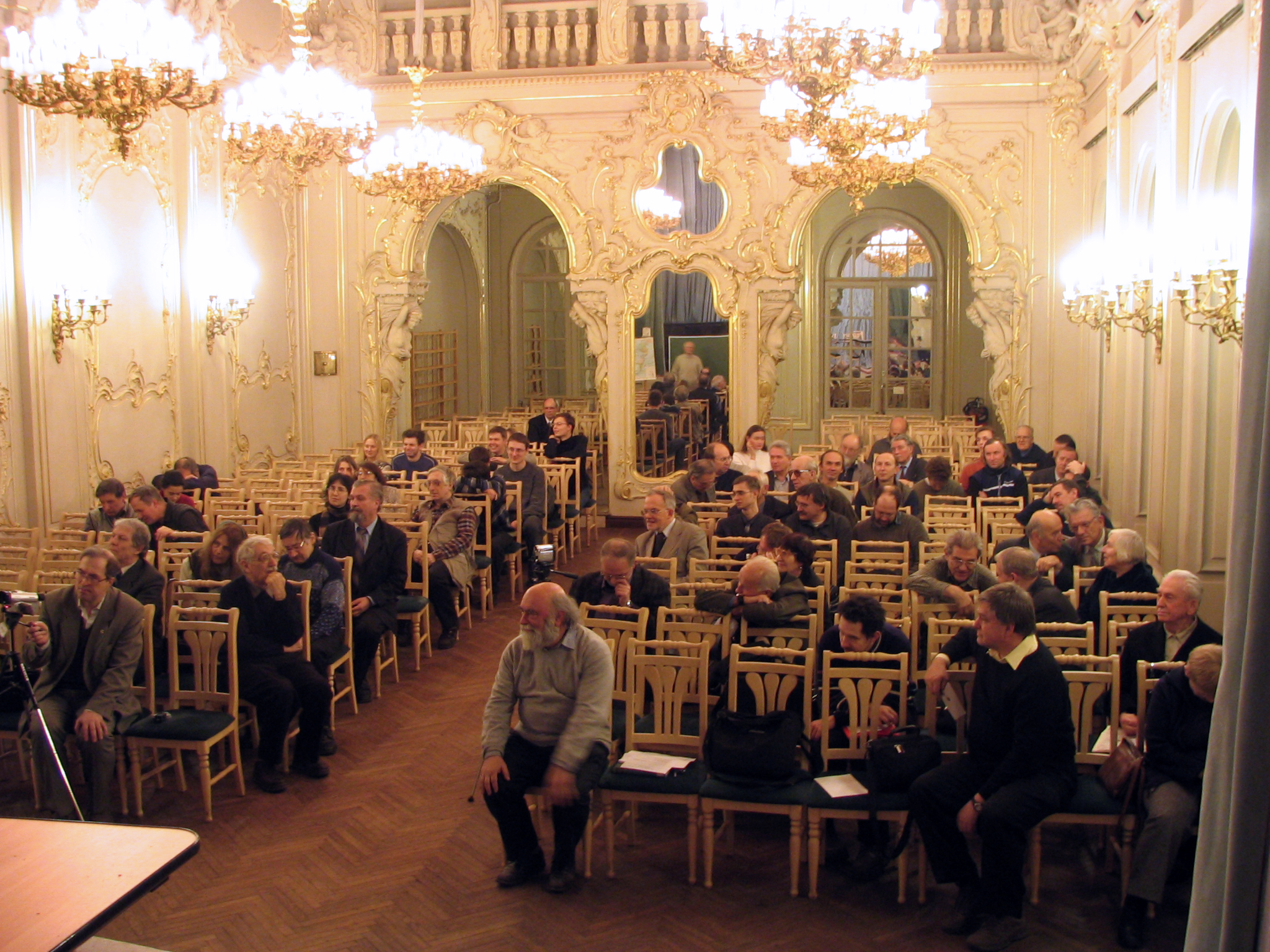
- Meeting of the society in the St. Petersburg House of Scientists, 22 December 2005
- Formation: 1890; 136 years ago
- Location: Fontanka 27, St. Petersburg, 191023, Russia
- Fields: Mathematics
- Official language: ru
- President: Yuri Matiyasevich
- Affiliations: European Mathematical Society
- Website: www.mathsoc.spb.ru
- Formerly called: Leningrad Mathematical Society (Russian: Ленинградское математическое общество) (1959–1990); Leningrad Physical and Mathematical Society (Russian: Ленинградское физико-математическое общество) (1924–1930); Petrograd Physical and Mathematical Society (Russian: Петроградское физико-математическое общество) (1921–1924); Saint Petersburg Mathematical Society (Russian: Санкт-Петербургское математическое общество) (1890–1905)

The Saint Petersburg Mathematical Society (Russian: Санкт-Петербургское математическое общество) is a mathematical society run by Saint Petersburg mathematicians.

== Historical notes ==
The St. Petersburg Mathematical Society was founded in 1890 and was the third founded mathematical society in Russia after those of Moscow (1867) and Khar'kov (1879). Its founder and first president was Vasily Imshenetskii, who also had founded earlier the Khar'kov Mathematical Society.

The Society was dissolved and subsequently revived twice, each time changing its name, sometime in between 1905 and 1917, the society ceased to function and by 1917 it had completely dissolved, perhaps due to the social agitations that destroyed many existing Russian scientific institutions. It was re-established by the initiative of Alexander Vasilyev in 1921 as the Petrograd Physical and Mathematical Society (subsequently called the Leningrad Physical and Mathematical Society). In 1930, the self-dissolution of the society was due to political reasons. Before the beginning of World War II in 1941, Leonid Kantorovich proposed to revive the society, and a similar failed attempt was made by Vladimir Smirnov in 1953: only in 1959 Yuri Linnik did succeed in reestablishing the society (then called the Leningrad Mathematical Society). It regained the original name the St. Petersburg Mathematical Society in 1991.

=== Timeline of former presidents ===
Years	President	Years	President	Years	President
1890–1892	Vasily Imshenetskii (rus)	1892–1905	Julian Sochocki	1921–1923	Alexander Vasilyev (rus)
1923–1930	Nikolai Günther	1959–1965	Yuri Linnik	1965–1985	Sergei Lozinskii (rus)
1985–1989	Dmitry Faddeev	1990–1998	Olga Ladyzhenskaya	1998–2008	Anatoly Vershik
2008–2013	Yuri Matiyasevich	2013-	Sergei Pilyugin		

=== Honorary members ===
- Pafnuty Chebyshev
- David Hilbert
- Felix Klein
- Konstantin Posse
- Julian Sochocki
- Vladimir Steklov
- Orest Khvolson
- Aleksey Krylov
- Ivan Ivanov
- Alexander Vasilyev (rus)
- Aleksandr Aleksandrov
- Sergei Bernstein
- Leonid Kantorovich
- Mark Krein
- Olga Ladyzhenskaya
- Andrey Markov
- Solomon Mikhlin
- Vladimir Smirnov
- Victor Zalgaller
- Nikolai Shanin
- Anatoly Vershik
- Ildar Ibragimov
- Vasilii Babich (rus)
- Vsevolod Solonnikov (rus)
- Nina Uraltseva

== Activities ==
=== "Young mathematician" prize ===
The "Young Mathematician" prize has been awarded since 1962.

The list of the laureates:

- V. G. Maz'ya, 1962
- B. B. Venkov, 1963
- V. S. Buslaev, 1964
- A. V. Yakovlev, 1965
- V. I. Derguzov, 1965
- A. S. Blagoveshchenskii, 1966
- V. P. Orevkov, 1967
- V. V. Zhuk, 1968
- Yu. V. Matiyasevich, 1970
- S. A. Vinogradov, 1971
- Ya. M. Eliashberg, 1973
- Yu. A. Davydov, 1974
- N. A. Shirokov, 1975
- O. Ya. Viro, 1975
- B. S. Tsirel'son, 1976
- E. M. Dyn'kin, 1976
- A. A. Suslin, 1977
- M. D. Sterlin, 1977
- S. V. Khrushchev, 1978
- L. N. Gordeev, 1978
- O. I. Reinov, 1980
- N. L. Gordeev, 1980
- N. E. Barabanov, 1980
- E. D. Gluskin, 1981
- A. R. Its, 1981
- A. S. Merkur'ev, 1982
- V. V. Peller, 1982
- E. K. Sklyanin, 1983
- D. Yu. Grigor'ev & A. L. Chistov, 1984
- V. L. Kobel'skii, 1984
- M. L. Lifshits, 1985
- M. Yu. Lyubich, 1987
- Yu. G. Safarov, 1987
- V. A. Kaimanovich, 1988
- N. Yu. Reshetikhin, 1988
- A. A. Borichev, 1989
- O. T. Izhboldin, 1989
- A. I. Barvinok, 1990
- G. Ya. Perelman, 1991
- D. Yu. Burago, 1992
- I. B. Fesenko, 1992
- F. L. Nazarov, 1993
- S. M. Shimorin, 1994
- S. V. Ivanov, 1995
- T. N. Shilkin, 1997
- S. K. Smirnov, 1997
- O. L. Vinogradov, 1997
- N. V. Tsilevich, 1998
- A. B. Pushnitskii, 1998
- G. B. Mikhalkin, 1999
- O. V. Demchenko, 2000
- S. G. Kryzhevich, 2001
- A. V. Malyutin, 2001
- A. G. Ershler, 2002
- A. N. Zinoviev, 2003
- A. D. Baranov, 2004
- D. S. Chelkak, 2004
- O. A. Tarakanov, 2005
- N. V. Durov, 2006
- K. V. Pervyshev, 2007
- V. A. Petrov, 2007
- A. Yu. Luzgarev, 2008
- V. V. Vysotskii, 2008
- A. K. Stavrova, 2009
- S. B. Tikhomirov, 2009
- P. N. Mnev, 2010
- Yu. S. Belov, 2011
- F. V. Petrov, 2011
- A. S. Ananyevsky, 2012
- R. S. Pusev, 2012
- K. A. Izyurov, 2013
- S. O. Ivanov, 2014
- P. B. Zatitskiy & D. M. Stolyarov, 2015
- A. A. Logunov, 2017
- M. V. Dolgopolik, 2018
- Yu. P. Petrova, 2019
- M. V. Platonova, 2019
- N. N. Senik, 2020
- A. V. Alpeev, 2021
- N. S. Ustinov, 2021
- D. D. Cherkashin, 2022
- G. A. Veprev, 2023
- E. A. Zlobina, 2024

== See also ==
- List of Mathematical Societies
