= Loomis–Whitney inequality =

Result in geometry

In mathematics, the Loomis–Whitney inequality is a result in geometry, which in its simplest form, allows one to estimate the "size" of a $d$-dimensional set by the sizes of its $(d-1)$-dimensional projections. The inequality has applications in incidence geometry, the study of so-called "lattice animals", and other areas.

The result is named after the American mathematicians Lynn Harold Loomis and Hassler Whitney, and was published in 1949.

== Statement of the inequality ==
Fix a dimension $d\ge 2$ and consider the projections

$$\pi_{j} : \mathbb{R}^{d} \to \mathbb{R}^{d - 1},$$
$$\pi_{j} : x = (x_{1}, \dots, x_{d}) \mapsto \hat{x}_{j} = (x_{1}, \dots, x_{j - 1}, x_{j + 1}, \dots, x_{d}).$$

For each 1 ≤ j ≤ d, let

$$g_{j} : \mathbb{R}^{d - 1} \to [0, + \infty),$$
$$g_{j} \in L^{d - 1} (\mathbb{R}^{d -1}).$$

Then the Loomis–Whitney inequality holds:

$$\left\|\prod_{j=1}^d g_j \circ \pi_j\right\|_{L^{1} (\mathbb{R}^{d })}
= \int_{\mathbb{R}^{d}} \prod_{j = 1}^{d} g_{j} ( \pi_{j} (x) ) \, \mathrm{d} x \leq \prod_{j = 1}^{d} \| g_{j} \|_{L^{d - 1} (\mathbb{R}^{d - 1})}.$$

Equivalently, taking $f_{j} (x) = g_{j} (x)^{d - 1},$ we have

$$f_{j} : \mathbb{R}^{d - 1} \to [0, + \infty),$$
$$f_{j} \in L^{1} (\mathbb{R}^{d -1})$$

implying

$$\int_{\mathbb{R}^{d}} \prod_{j = 1}^{d} f_{j} ( \pi_{j} (x) )^{1 / (d - 1)} \, \mathrm{d} x \leq \prod_{j = 1}^{d} \left( \int_{\mathbb{R}^{d - 1}} f_{j} (\hat{x}_{j}) \, \mathrm{d} \hat{x}_{j} \right)^{1 / (d - 1)}.$$

== A special case ==
The Loomis–Whitney inequality can be used to relate the Lebesgue measure of a subset of Euclidean space $\mathbb{R}^{d}$ to its "average widths" in the coordinate directions. This is in fact the original version published by Loomis and Whitney in 1949 (the above is a generalization).

Let E be some measurable subset of $\mathbb{R}^{d}$ and let

$$f_{j} = \mathbf{1}_{\pi_{j} (E)}$$

be the indicator function of the projection of E onto the jth coordinate hyperplane. It follows that for any point x in E,

$$\prod_{j = 1}^{d} f_{j} (\pi_{j} (x))^{1 / (d - 1)} = \prod_{j = 1}^{d} 1 = 1.$$

Hence, by the Loomis–Whitney inequality,

$$\int_{\mathbb{R}^{d}} \mathbf 1_E(x) \, \mathrm{d} x = | E | \leq \prod_{j = 1}^{d} | \pi_{j} (E) |^{1 / (d - 1)},$$

and hence

$$| E | \geq \prod_{j = 1}^{d} \frac{| E |}{| \pi_{j} (E) |}.$$

The quantity

$$\frac{| E |}{| \pi_{j} (E) |}$$

can be thought of as the average width of $E$ in the $j$th coordinate direction. This interpretation of the Loomis–Whitney inequality also holds if we consider a finite subset of Euclidean space and replace Lebesgue measure by counting measure.

The following proof is the original one

Proof

Overview: We prove it for unions of unit cubes on the integer grid, then take the continuum limit. When $d=1, 2$, it is obvious. Now induct on $d+1$. The only trick is to use Hölder's inequality for counting measures.

Enumerate the dimensions of $\R^{d+1}$ as $0, 1, ..., d$.

Given $N$ unit cubes on the integer grid in $\R^{d+1}$, with their union being $T$, we project them to the 0-th coordinate. Each unit cube projects to an integer unit interval on $\R$. Now define the following:

- $I_1, ..., I_k$ enumerate all such integer unit intervals on the 0-th coordinate.
- Let $T_i$ be the set of all unit cubes that projects to $I_i$.
- Let $N_j$ be the area of $\pi_j(T)$, with $j = 0, 1, ..., d$.
- Let $a_i$ be the volume of $T_i$. We have $\sum_i a_i = N$, and $a_i \leq N_0$.
- Let $T_{ij}$ be $\pi_j(T_i)$ for all $j = 1, ..., d$.
- Let $a_{ij}$ be the area of $T_{ij}$. We have $\sum_i a_{ij} = N_j$.

By induction on each slice of $T_i$, we have $a_i^{d-1}\leq \prod_{j=1}^d a_{ij}$

Multiplying by $a_i \leq N_0$, we have $a_i^{d}\leq N_0\prod_{j=1}^d a_{ij}$

Thus
$$N = \sum_i a_i \leq \sum_i N_0^{1/d} \prod_{j=1}^d a_{ij}^{1/d} =  N_0^{1/d} \sum_{i=1}^k\prod_{j=1}^d a_{ij}^{1/d}$$

Now, the sum-product can be written as an integral over counting measure, allowing us to perform Holder's inequality:
$$\sum_{i=1}^k\prod_{j=1}^d a_{ij}^{1/d} = \int_i \prod_{j=1}^d a_{ij}^{1/d} = \left\|\prod_{j=1}^d a_{\cdot, j}^{1/d}\right\|_1 \leq \prod_j \|a_{\cdot, j}^{1/d}\|_d=\prod_{j=1}^d \left(\sum_{i=1}^k a_{ij}\right)^{1/d}$$

Plugging in $\sum_i a_{ij} = N_j$, we get $N^d \leq \prod_{j=0}^d N_j$

Corollary. Since $2 |\pi_j(E)| \leq |\partial E|$, we get a loose isoperimetric inequality:

$$|E|^{d-1}\leq 2^{-d}|\partial E|^d$$
Iterating the theorem yields $| E | \leq \prod_{1 \leq j < k \leq d} | \pi_{j}\circ \pi_k (E) |^{\binom{d-1}{2}^{-1}}$ and more generally
$$| E | \leq \prod_j | \pi_{j} (E) |^{\binom{d-1}{k}^{-1}}$$
where $\pi_j$ enumerates over all projections of $\R^d$ to its $d-k$ dimensional subspaces.

== Generalizations ==
The Loomis–Whitney inequality is a special case of the Brascamp–Lieb inequality, in which the projections π_{j} above are replaced by more general linear maps, not necessarily all mapping onto spaces of the same dimension.

== Sources ==
- Alon, Noga; Spencer, Joel H. (2016). The probabilistic method. Wiley Series in Discrete Mathematics and Optimization (Fourth edition of 1992 original ed.). Hoboken, NJ: John Wiley & Sons, Inc. ISBN 978-1-119-06195-3. MR 3524748. Zbl 1333.05001.
- Boucheron, Stéphane; Lugosi, Gábor; Massart, Pascal (2013). Concentration inequalities. A nonasymptotic theory of independence. Oxford: Oxford University Press. doi:10.1093/acprof:oso/9780199535255.001.0001. ISBN 978-0-19-953525-5. MR 3185193. Zbl 1279.60005.
- Burago, Yu. D.; Zalgaller, V. A. (1988). Geometric inequalities. Grundlehren der mathematischen Wissenschaften. Vol. 285. Translated by Sosinskiĭ, A. B. Berlin: Springer-Verlag. doi:10.1007/978-3-662-07441-1. ISBN 3-540-13615-0. MR 0936419. Zbl 0633.53002.
- Hadwiger, H. (1957). Vorlesungen über Inhalt, Oberfläche und Isoperimetrie. Grundlehren der mathematischen Wissenschaften. Vol. 93. Berlin–Göttingen–Heidelberg: Springer-Verlag. doi:10.1007/978-3-642-94702-5. ISBN 3-642-94702-6. MR 0102775. Zbl 0078.35703.
- Loomis, L. H.; Whitney, H. (1949). "An inequality related to the isoperimetric inequality". Bulletin of the American Mathematical Society. 55 (10): 961–962. doi:10.1090/S0002-9904-1949-09320-5. MR 0031538. Zbl 0035.38302.
