= Burago =

Burago is a surname. Notable people with the surname include:

- Aleksandr Burago (c. 1853–1883), commander of the Russian Imperial army
- Dmitri Burago (born 1964), Russian mathematician
- Yuri Burago (born 1936), Soviet Russian mathematician

== See also ==
- Bburago, an Italian model car manufacturer
