= Workshop on Logic, Language, Information and Computation =

The Workshop on Logic, Language, Information and Computation (WoLLIC) is an academic conference in the field of pure and applied logic and theoretical computer science. WoLLIC has been organised annually since 1994, typically in June or July; the conference is scientifically sponsored by the Association for Logic, Language and Information, the Association for Symbolic Logic, the European Association for Theoretical Computer Science and the European Association for Computer Science Logic.

== Ranking ==
According to Computer Science Conference Ranking 2010, the conference is ranked "C" among over 1900 international conferences across the world. It is also ranked "C" on The CORE Conference Ranking Exercise - CORE Portal (2023). It is currently ranked with 7 Bars (Last 5 years), Field-Rating 1, Algorithms & Theory, at Microsoft MSAR field ratings (2014). On Google Scholar, the conference gets a score of 12 as its h5-index, and a score of 14 as its h5-median.

== History ==
- 1994: Recife, Brazil
- 1995: Recife, Brazil
- 1996: Salvador, Brazil
- 1997: Fortaleza, Brazil
- 1998: São Paulo, Brazil
- 1999: Itatiaia, Brazil
- 2000: Natal, Brazil
- 2001: Brasília, Brazil
- 2002: Rio de Janeiro, Brazil
- 2003: Ouro Preto, Brazil
- 2004: Fontainebleau, France
- 2005: Florianópolis, Brazil
- 2006: Stanford, United States
- 2007: Rio de Janeiro, Brazil
- 2008: Edinburgh, United Kingdom
- 2009: Tokyo, Japan
- 2010: Brasília, Brazil
- 2011: Philadelphia, United States
- 2012: Buenos Aires, Argentina
- 2013: Darmstadt, Germany
- 2014: Valparaíso, Chile
- 2015: Bloomington, United States
- 2016: Puebla, Mexico
- 2017: London, United Kingdom
- 2018: Bogotá, Colombia
- 2019: Utrecht, Netherlands
- 2020: Lima, Peru (cancelled)
- 2021: online
- 2022: Iași, Romania
- 2023: Halifax, Canada
- 2024: Bern, Switzerland
- 2025: Porto, Portugal
- 2026: Lima, Peru

== Future Venues ==
The meetings alternate between Latin America and US/Europe/Asia. The following locations are planned for future meetings:

- 2027: Helsinki, Finland

== Proceedings ==
- Logic, Language, Information, and Computation - 32nd International Workshop, WoLLIC 2026, Patricia Johann and Ruy de Queiroz (eds.), Lima, Peru, August 3-6, 2026, Lecture Notes in Computer Science, Springer Berlin / Heidelberg, ISSN 0302-9743 (Print) ISSN 1611-3349 (Online), Volume 16757/2026, doi:10.1007/978-3-032-33485-5, ISBN 978-3-032-33485-5, August 2026.
- Logic, Language, Information, and Computation - 31st International Workshop, WoLLIC 2025, Dexter Kozen and Ruy de Queiroz (eds.), Porto, Portugal, July 14–17, 2025, Lecture Notes in Computer Science, Springer Berlin / Heidelberg, ISSN 0302-9743 (Print) ISSN 1611-3349 (Online), Volume 15942/2025, doi:10.1007/978-3-031-99536-1, ISBN 978-3-031-99535-4, September 2025.
- Logic, Language, Information, and Computation - 30th International Workshop, WoLLIC 2024, George Metcalfe, Thomas Studer, Ruy de Queiroz (eds.), Bern, Switzerland, June 10–13, 2024, Lecture Notes in Computer Science, Springer Berlin / Heidelberg, ISSN 0302-9743 (Print) ISSN 1611-3349 (Online), Volume 14672/2024, doi:10.1007/978-3-031-62687-6, ISBN 978-3-031-62686-9, July 2024.
- Logic, Language, Information, and Computation - 29th International Workshop, WoLLIC 2023, Helle Hvid Hansen, Andre Scedrov, Ruy de Queiroz (eds.), Halifax, NS, Canada, July 11–14, 2023, Lecture Notes in Computer Science, Springer Berlin / Heidelberg, ISSN 0302-9743 (Print) ISSN 1611-3349 (Online), Volume 13923/2023, doi:10.1007/978-3-031-39784-4, ISBN 978-3-031-39783-7, October 2023.
- Logic, Language, Information and Computation - 28th International Workshop, WoLLIC 2022, Agata Ciabattoni, Elaine Pimentel & Ruy de Queiroz (eds.), Iaşi, Romania, September 20–23, 2022. Lecture Notes in Computer Science, Springer Berlin / Heidelberg, ISSN 0302-9743 (Print) ISSN 1611-3349 (Online), Volume 13468/2022, doi:10.1007/978-3-031-15298-6, ISBN 978-3-031-15297-9.
- Logic, Language, Information and Computation - 27th International Workshop, WoLLIC 2021, Alexandra Silva, Renata Wassermann & Ruy de Queiroz (eds.), Virtual Event, October 5–8, 2021. Lecture Notes in Computer Science, Springer Berlin / Heidelberg, ISSN 0302-9743 (Print) ISSN 1611-3349 (Online), Volume 13038/2021, doi:10.1007/978-3-030-88853-4, ISBN 978-3-030-88852-7.
- Logic, Language, Information and Computation - 26th International Workshop, WoLLIC 2019, Rosalie Iemhoff, Michael Moortgat & Ruy de Queiroz (eds.), Utrecht, The Netherlands, July 2–5, 2019. Lecture Notes in Computer Science, Springer Berlin / Heidelberg, ISSN 0302-9743 (Print) ISSN 1611-3349 (Online), Volume 11541/2019, doi:10.1007/978-3-662-59533-6, ISBN 978-3-662-59532-9.
- Logic, Language, Information and Computation - 25th International Workshop, WoLLIC 2018, Lawrence S. Moss, Ruy de Queiroz & Maricarmen Martínez (eds.), Bogotá, Colombia, July 24–27, 2018. Lecture Notes in Computer Science, Springer Berlin / Heidelberg, ISSN 0302-9743 (Print) ISSN 1611-3349 (Online), Volume 10944/2018, doi:10.1007/978-3-662-57669-4, ISBN 978-3-662-57668-7.
- Logic, Language, Information and Computation - 24th International Workshop, WoLLIC 2017, Juliette Kennedy & Ruy de Queiroz (eds.), London, UK, July 18–21, 2017. Lecture Notes in Computer Science, Springer Berlin / Heidelberg, ISSN 0302-9743 (Print) ISSN 1611-3349 (Online), Volume 10388/2017, doi:10.1007/978-3-662-55386-2, ISBN 978-3-662-55385-5.
- Logic, Language, Information and Computation - 23rd International Workshop, WoLLIC 2016, Jouko Väänänen, Åsa Hirvonen & Ruy de Queiroz (eds.), Puebla, Mexico, August 16–19, 2016. Lecture Notes in Computer Science, Springer Berlin / Heidelberg, ISSN 0302-9743 (Print) ISSN 1611-3349 (Online), Volume 9803/2016, doi:10.1007/978-3-662-52921-8, ISBN 978-3-662-52920-1.
- Logic, Language, Information and Computation - 22nd International Workshop, WoLLIC 2015, Valeria de Paiva, Ruy de Queiroz, Lawrence Moss, Daniel Leivant & Anjolina de Oliveira (eds.), Bloomington, Indiana, USA, July 20–23, 2015. Lecture Notes in Computer Science, Springer Berlin / Heidelberg, ISSN 0302-9743 (Print) ISSN 1611-3349 (Online), Volume 9160/2015, doi:10.1007/978-3-662-47709-0, ISBN 978-3-662-47708-3.
- Logic, Language, Information and Computation - 21st International Workshop, WoLLIC 2014, Ulrich Kohlenbach, Pablo Barceló & Ruy de Queiroz (eds.), Valparaíso, Chile, September 1–4, 2014. Lecture Notes in Computer Science, Springer Berlin / Heidelberg, ISSN 0302-9743 (Print) ISSN 1611-3349 (Online), Volume 8652/2014, doi:10.1007/978-3-662-44145-9, ISBN 978-3-662-44144-2.
- Logic, Language, Information and Computation - 20th International Workshop, WoLLIC 2013, Leonid Libkin, Ulrich Kohlenbach & Ruy de Queiroz (eds.), Darmstadt, Germany, August 20–23, 2013. Lecture Notes in Computer Science, Springer Berlin / Heidelberg, ISSN 0302-9743 (Print) ISSN 1611-3349 (Online), Volume 8071/2013, doi:10.1007/978-3-642-39992-3, ISBN 978-3-642-39992-3.
- Logic, Language, Information and Computation - 19th International Workshop, WoLLIC 2012, Luke Ong & Ruy de Queiroz (eds.), Buenos Aires, Argentina, September 3–6, 2012. Lecture Notes in Computer Science, Springer Berlin / Heidelberg, ISSN 0302-9743 (Print) ISSN 1611-3349 (Online), Volume 7456/2012, doi:10.1007/978-3-642-32620-2, ISBN 978-3-642-32620-2.
- Logic, Language, Information and Computation - 18th International Workshop, WoLLIC 2011, Lev D. Beklemishev & Ruy de Queiroz (eds.), Philadelphia, PA, USA, May 18–20, 2011. Lecture Notes in Computer Science, Springer Berlin / Heidelberg, ISSN 0302-9743 (Print) ISSN 1611-3349 (Online), Volume 6642/2011, doi:10.1007/978-3-642-20919-2, ISBN 978-3-642-20919-2.
- Logic, Language, Information and Computation - 17th International Workshop, WoLLIC 2010, A. Dawar & R. de Queiroz (eds.), Brasília, Brazil, July 6–9, 2010. Lecture Notes in Computer Science, Springer Berlin / Heidelberg, ISSN 0302-9743 (Print) ISSN 1611-3349 (Online), Volume 6188/2010, doi:10.1007/978-3-642-13823-2, ISBN 978-3-642-13823-2.
- Logic, Language, Information and Computation - 16th International Workshop, WoLLIC 2009, H. Ono, M. Kanazawa & R. de Queiroz (eds.), Tokyo, Japan, June 21–24, 2009. Lecture Notes in Computer Science, Springer Berlin / Heidelberg, ISSN 0302-9743 (Print) ISSN 1611-3349 (Online), Volume 5514/2009, doi:10.1007/978-3-642-02261-6, ISBN 978-3-642-02260-9.
- Logic, Language, Information and Computation - 15th International Workshop, WoLLIC 2008, W. Hodges & R. de Queiroz (eds.), Edinburgh, UK, July 1–4, 2008. Lecture Notes in Computer Science, Springer Berlin / Heidelberg, ISSN 0302-9743 (Print) ISSN 1611-3349 (Online), Volume 5110/2008, doi:10.1007/978-3-540-69937-8, ISBN 978-3-540-69936-1.
- Logic, Language, Information and Computation - 14th International Workshop, WoLLIC 2007, D. Leivant & R. de Queiroz (eds.), Rio de Janeiro, Brazil, July 2–5, 2007. Lecture Notes in Computer Science, Springer Berlin / Heidelberg, ISSN 0302-9743 (Print) ISSN 1611-3349 (Online), Volume 4576/2007, doi:10.1007/978-3-540-73445-1, ISBN 978-3-540-73443-7.
- Proceedings of the 13th Workshop on Logic, Language, Information and Computation (WoLLIC 2006), Logic, Language, Information and Computation 2006. Stanford University, CA, USA. 18–21 July 2006. Edited by G. Mints and R. de Queiroz. Electronic Notes in Theoretical Computer Science. ISSN 1571-0661. Volume 165, Pages 1–226 (22 November 2006). (Preface doi:10.1016/j.entcs.2006.07.021)
- Proceedings of the 12th Workshop on Logic, Language, Information and Computation (WoLLIC 2005). Florianópolis, Santa Catarina, Brazil. 19–22 July 2005. Edited by R. de Queiroz, A. Macintyre and G. Bittencourt. Electronic Notes in Theoretical Computer Science. ISSN 1571-0661. Volume 143, Pages 1–222 (6 January 2006). (Preface doi:10.1016/j.entcs.2005.06.032)
- Proceedings of the 11th Workshop on Logic, Language, Information and Computation (WoLLIC 2004). Fontainebleau (Paris), France. 19–22 July 2004. Edited by R. de Queiroz and P. Cégielski. Electronic Notes in Theoretical Computer Science. ISSN 1571-0661. Volume 123, Pages 1–240 (1 March 2005). (Preface doi:10.1016/j.entcs.2004.05.012)
- WoLLIC'2003, 10th Workshop on Logic, Language, Information and Computation. Ouro Preto (Minas Gerais), Brazil. 29 July to 1 August 2003. Edited by R. de Queiroz, E. Pimentel and L. Figueiredo. Electronic Notes in Theoretical Computer Science. ISSN 1571-0661. Volume 84, Pages 1–231 (September 2003). (Preface doi:10.1016/S1571-0661(05)80858-8)
- WoLLIC'2002, 9th Workhop on Logic, Language, Information and Computation. Rio de Janeiro, Brazil. 30 July to 2 August 2002. Edited by Ruy de Queiroz, Luiz Carlos Pereira, Edward Hermann Haeusler. Electronic Notes in Theoretical Computer Science. ISSN 1571-0661. Volume 67, Pages 1–314 (October 2002). (Preface doi:10.1016/S1571-0661(05)80556-0)

== Special Issues of Scientific Journals ==
- Mathematical Structures in Computer Science, 29th Workshop on Logic, Language, Information and Computation (WoLLIC 2023). Edited by Helle Hvid Hansen, Andre Scedrov and Ruy de Queiroz. Volume ??, Issue ?, December 2025, Cambridge University Press.(Preface)
- Mathematical Structures in Computer Science, 28th Workshop on Logic, Language, Information and Computation (WoLLIC 2022). Edited by Agata Ciabatoni, Elaine Pimentel and Ruy de Queiroz. Volume 34, Issue 7, August 2024, Cambridge University Press.(Preface)
- Journal of Logic and Computation, 27th Workshop on Logic, Language, Information and Computation (WoLLIC 2021). Edited by Alexandra Silva, Renata Wassermann and Ruy de Queiroz. Volume 35, Issue 6, September 2025, Oxford University Press. (Preface)
- Journal of Logic, Language and Information, 25th Workshop on Logic, Language, Information and Computation (WoLLIC 2018). Edited by Lawrence Moss & Ruy de Queiroz. Volume 31, Issue 4, December 2022, Springer.
- Information and Computation, 26th Workshop on Logic, Language, Information and Computation (WoLLIC 2019). Edited by Ruy de Queiroz. Volume 287 (September 2022), Elsevier.
- Archive for Mathematical Logic, 24th Workshop on Logic, Language, Information and Computation (WoLLIC 2017). Edited by Juliette Kennedy and Ruy de Queiroz. Volume 60, Issue 5, Pages 525-681 (July 2021), Springer.
- Annals of Pure and Applied Logic, 23rd Workshop on Logic, Language, Information and Computation (WoLLIC 2016). Edited by Jouko Väänänen and Ruy de Queiroz. Volume 170, Issue 9, Pages 921-1150 (September 2019), Elsevier.
- Mathematical Structures in Computer Science, 22nd Workshop on Logic, Language, Information and Computation (WoLLIC 2015). Edited by Valeria de Paiva and Ruy de Queiroz. Volume 29, Issue 6, June 2019, Cambridge University Press.
- Information and Computation, 21st Workshop on Logic, Language, Information and Computation (WoLLIC 2014). Edited by Ulrich Kohlenbach, Pablo Barcelò and Ruy de Queiroz. Volume 255, Part 2, Pages 193–334 (August 2017).
- Journal of Computer and System Sciences, 20th Workshop on Logic, Language, Information and Computation (WoLLIC 2013). Edited by Leonid Libkin, Ulrich Kohlenbach and Ruy de Queiroz. Volume 88, Pages 1–290 (September 2017).
- Theoretical Computer Science, Logic, Language, Information and Computation, 19th Workshop on Logic, Language, Information and Computation. Buenos Aires, Argentina. 3–6 September 2012. Edited by Luke Ong and Ruy de Queiroz. Volume 603, Pages 1–146 (25 October 2015).
- Journal of Computer and System Sciences, 18th Workshop on Logic, Language, Information and Computation (WoLLIC 2011). Edited by Lev Beklemishev, Ruy de Queiroz and Andre Scedrov. Volume 80, Issue 6, Pages 1037-1174 (September 2014).
- Journal of Computer and System Sciences, 17th Workshop on Logic, Language, Information and Computation (WoLLIC 2010). Edited by Anuj Dawar and Ruy de Queiroz. Volume 80, Issue 2, Pages 321-498 (March 2014).
- Ono, Hiroakira; Kanazawa, Makoto; de Queiroz, Ruy (September 2011). "Logic, Language, Information and Computation". Fundamenta Informaticae. 106 (2–4): 119–338.
- Journal of Computer and System Sciences, Workshop on Logic, Language, Information and Computation (WoLLIC 2008). Edited by Wilfrid Hodges and Ruy de Queiroz. Volume 76, Issue 5, Pages 281-388 (August 2010).
- Information and Computation, Special issue: 14th Workshop on Logic, Language, Information and Computation (WoLLIC 2007). Edited by Daniel Leivant and Ruy de Queiroz. Volume 208, Issue 5, Pages 395-604, (May 2010).
- Information and Computation, Special issue: 13th Workshop on Logic, Language, Information and Computation (WoLLIC 2006). Edited by Grigori Mints, Valeria de Paiva and Ruy de Queiroz. Volume 207, Issue 10, Pages 969-1094, (October 2009).
- Annals of Pure and Applied Logic, 12th Workshop on Logic, Language, Information and Computation. Florianópolis, Santa Catarina, Brazil. 19–22 July 2005. Edited by R. de Queiroz and A. Macintyre. Volume 152, Issues 1-3, Pages 1–180 (March 2008).
- Theoretical Computer Science, Logic, Language, Information and Computation, 11th Workshop on Logic, Language, Information and Computation. Paris, France. 19–22 July 2004. Edited by R. de Queiroz and P. Cégielski. Volume 364, Issue 2, Pages 143-270 (6 November 2006).
- Theoretical Computer Science, Logic, Language, Information and Computation. Minas Gerais, Brazil. 29 July-1 August 2003. Edited by R. de Queiroz and D. Kozen. Volume 355, Issue 2, Pages 105-260 (11 April 2006).
- Annals of Pure and Applied Logic, Papers presented at the 9th Workshop on Logic, Language, Information and Computation (WoLLIC’2002). 30 July-2 August 2002. Edited by R. de Queiroz, B. Poizat and S. Artemov. Volume 134, Issue 1, Pages 1–93 (June 2005).
- Matemática Contemporânea. 8th Workshop on Logic, Language, Information and Computation - WoLLIC'2001. Universidade de Brasília, July -August 2001 - Brasília. Edited by John T. Baldwin, Ruy J. G. B. de Queiroz, Edward H. Haeusler. Volume 24, 2003.
- Logic Journal of the Interest Group in Pure and Applied Logics. 7th Workshop on Logic, Language, Information and Computation - WoLLIC 2000. Natal (State of Rio Grande do Norte), August 15–18, 2000. Edited by Ruy J. G. B. de Queiroz. Volume 9, Issue 6, 2001.
- Logic Journal of the Interest Group in Pure and Applied Logics. 6th Workshop on Logic, Language, Information and Computation - WoLLIC'99. Itatiaia National Park (State of Rio de Janeiro), May 25–28, 1999. Edited by Ruy J. G. B. de Queiroz. Volume 8, Issue 5, 2000.
