= Slissenko (surname) =

Slissenko or Slisenko is a Ukrainian-language surname. Notable people with the surname include:

- Anatol Slissenko, Soviet, Russian and French mathematician and computer scientist
- Vasyl Slisenko, Ukrainian physicist, director of the Institute for Nuclear Research of NASU
