= Buslaev =

Buslaev (Russian: Буслаев) is a Russian male surname, its feminine counterpart is Buslaeva. Notable people with the surname include:

- Fyodor Buslaev (1818–1898), Russian philologist, art historian, and folklorist
- Vladimir Buslaev (1937–2012), Russian mathematical physicist
