= Aleksandr Aleksandrov (mathematician) =

Russian mathematician (1912–1999)

- Александр Александров
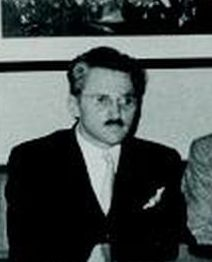
- Aleksandrov in 1954
- Born: 4 August 1912; Volyn, Ryazan Governorate, Russian Empire
- Died: 27 July 1999 (aged 86); Saint Petersburg, Russia
- Education: Leningrad State University
- Known for: Geometry and Physics
- Children: 2
- Scientific career
- Fields: Mathematics, physics
- Workplaces: Novosibirsk State University; Leningrad State University
- Doctoral advisors: Vladimir Fock; Boris Delaunay
- Doctoral students: Yuri Burago; Vladik Kreinovich; Grigori Perelman; Alexei Pogorelov; Victor Zalgaller

Aleksandr Danilovich Aleksandrov (Note: Also transliterated as Alexandr or Alexander (first name), and Alexandrov (last name).) (Russian: Алекса́ндр Дани́лович Алекса́ндров; 4 August 1912 – 27 July 1999) was a Soviet and Russian mathematician, physicist, philosopher and mountaineer.

== Personal life ==
Aleksandr Aleksandrov was born in 1912 in Volyn, Ryazan Oblast. His father was a headmaster of a secondary school in St Petersburg and his mother a teacher at said school, thus the young Alekandrov spent a majority of his childhood in the city. His family was old Russian nobility—students noted ancestral portraits which hung in his office. His sisters were Soviet botanist Vera Danilovna Aleksandrov (RU) and Maria Danilovna Aleksandrova, author of the first monograph on gerontopsychology in the USSR. In 1937, he married a student of the Faculty of Physics, Marianna Leonidovna Georg. Together they had two children: Daria (b. 1948) and Daniil (RU) (b. 1957). In 1980, he married Svetlana Mikhailovna Vladimirova (née Bogacheva). In 1951 he became a member of the Communist Party. While serving as a deputy of the Supreme Soviet of the Russian SFSR, Aleksandrov abstained in 1961 from voting on a law that introduced the death penalty for currency offences with retroactive effect.

Alekandrov had a personal love for poetry, writing and translating. Once, on a trip to London, he was received as a visiting Shakespeare scholar. He was also very well travelled, visiting India, the US, and throughout Europe.

== Scientific career ==
He graduated from the Department of Physics of Leningrad State University. His advisors there were Vladimir Fock, a physicist, and Boris Delaunay, a mathematician. In 1933 Aleksandrov worked at the State Optical Institute (GOI) and at the same time gave lectures at the Department of Mathematics and Mechanics of the university. He completed his Ph.D. in 1935 at the university and later in 1937 — a D.Sc. dissertation. He became a professor at the university, while also working at LOMI, the Leningrad Department of the Steklov Mathematical Institute (now PDMI, Petersburg Department of the Mathematical Institute). Appointed the rector of the university in 1952, Aleksandrov remained in this position until 1964. He was the youngest rector in university history, and was fairly popular. One of his main contributions was the attempted move of Leningrad State University to Old Peterhof, which proved unsuccessful. In 1946 he became a corresponding member, and in 1964 a full member of the USSR Academy of Sciences. Since 1975 he was also a member of the Accademia dei Quaranta.

From 1964 to 1986 Aleksandrov lived in Novosibirsk, heading the Laboratory of Geometry of the Institute of Mathematics of the Siberian Division of the USSR Academy of Sciences, teaching at Novosibirsk State University. In 1986 he returned to Leningrad (now Saint Petersburg) to head the geometry laboratory at LOMI.

Aleksandrov's main work was in the study of differential geometry and physics. His work in geometry specifically is said to be second only to Gauss by N. V. Efimov, V. A. Zalgaller and A. V. Pogorelov.

== Awards ==
Partial list of the awards, medals, and prizes awarded to Aleksandrov:

- Stalin Prize (1942)
- Lobachevsky International Prize (1951)
- Euler Gold Medal of the Russian Academy of Sciences (1992)

One of the many orders that he was awarded was given to him in 1990 for his efforts in preserving genetics from the attacks of the pseudoscience of Lysenkoism that had official state support in the times of Stalin and Khrushchev.

== Works by Aleksandrov ==
Aleksandrov wrote a multitude of books, scientific papers, textbooks for various levels (schools to universities), including Convex Polyhedra, originally published in Russian in 1950 and translated into English in 2005. He also wrote non-mathematical papers, memoirs about famous scientists, and philosophical essays dealing with the moral values of science.

A full bibliography is available in [1]. Selected works are available in English:

- Alexandrov, A.D. Selected works. Part 1: Selected scientific papers. Amsterdam: Gordon and Breach Publishers. x, 322 p. (1996). ISBN 2-88124-984-1
- Alexandrov, A.D. Selected works. Intrinsic geometry of convex surfaces. Vol. 2. Boca Raton, FL: Chapman & Hall/CRC. xiii, 426 p. (2005). ISBN 0-415-29802-4
- Alexandrov, A.D. Convex polyhedra. Springer: Berlin. xi, 539 p. (2005). ISBN 3-540-23158-7 (1st edition, 1950)
- Alexandrov, A.D. Die innere Geometrie der konvexen Flächen. Akademie Verlag. (1955). (German translation of 1948 Russian original)

== Students of Aleksandrov ==
- I. Liberman, S. Olovianishnikoff, P. Kostelyanetz — all the three of them died on the battlefields of World War II
- A. Pogorelov — from Kharkov
- A. Yusupov — from Bukhara
- Students from the Aleksandrov Leningrad period (ordered by the time of joining the seminars): Yu. Borisov, V. Zalgaller, Yu. Reshetnyak, I. Bakelman, Yu. Volkov, A. Zamorzaev, S. Bogacheva (who later married Aleksandrov), Yu. Borovskii, R. Pimenov
- Sobchuk and Starokhozyayev — from Ukraine
- G. Rusiyeshvili — from Georgia (country)
- B. Frank and H. Frank — from Germany
- Yu. Burago, V. Kreinovich; Grigori Perelman
- Moved from Alma-Ata after Aleksandrov's lecture tour there: M. Kvachko, V. Ovchinnikova, E. Sen'kin
- Stayed in Alma-Ata: A. Zilberberg, V. Strel'cov, D. Yusupov
- Novosibirsk students: A. Guts, A. Kuz'minykh, A. Levichev, and A. Shaidenko.

Both in St. Petersburg and Novosibirsk Aleksandrov participated in joint research also with some of his students' students. Several of them became his co-authors: V. Berestovskii, A. Verner, N. Netsvetaev, I. Nikolaev, and V. Ryzhik.

His last Ph.D. student was Grigori Perelman who proved Thurston's geometrization conjecture in 2002/2003 which contains the Poincaré conjecture as a special case.

== Mountaineering ==
Aleksandrov became attracted to alpinism under the influence of his advisor Boris Delaunay. In the summer of 1937, after defending his D.Sc.,

…together with I. Chashnikov he makes a first climb to the Chotchi summit, and with K. Piskaryov performs a climb of Bu-Ul'gen via the western wall (one of the first wall climbs in the history of the Soviet alpinism).
[…] In 1940 he participates in a record-making traversal[…] He manages, almost by a miracle, to stop the fall of A. Gromov, who had fallen along with a snow shelf. It was with this traversal that Aleksandrov completed the alpinist sports master requirements. The German-Soviet War postponed awarding him this honorary title until 1949.

During his rectorship, Aleksandrov also advanced the mountaineering sport activities in the university, actively participating in the climbs.

The fiftieth birthday was celebrated by Aleksandrov in the mountains with his friends. On that day he made a solo first climb of an

…unnamed peak 6222 m (Shakhdarinsk ridge, Pamir), that as he suggested was then named "The peak of the Leningrad university."

During later years Aleksandrov was unable to climb due to health problems, yet he never ceased dreaming of climbing. Finally, in 1982, the year of his seventieth birthday, he, together with K. Tolstov, performed in Tian Shan his last climb, of the Panfilov Peak...

== See also ==
- CAT(k) space
- Cauchy's theorem
- Alexandrov theorem
- Aleksandrov–Rassias problem
- Alexandrov–Fenchel inequality
- Alexandrov's uniqueness theorem
- Alexandrov’s soap bubble theorem
- Alexandrov's theorem on Lorentz transformations
