= St. Petersburg Department of Steklov Mathematical Institute of the Russian Academy of Sciences =

Soviet-Russian research organization

Coordinates: 59°56′03″N 30°20′34″E

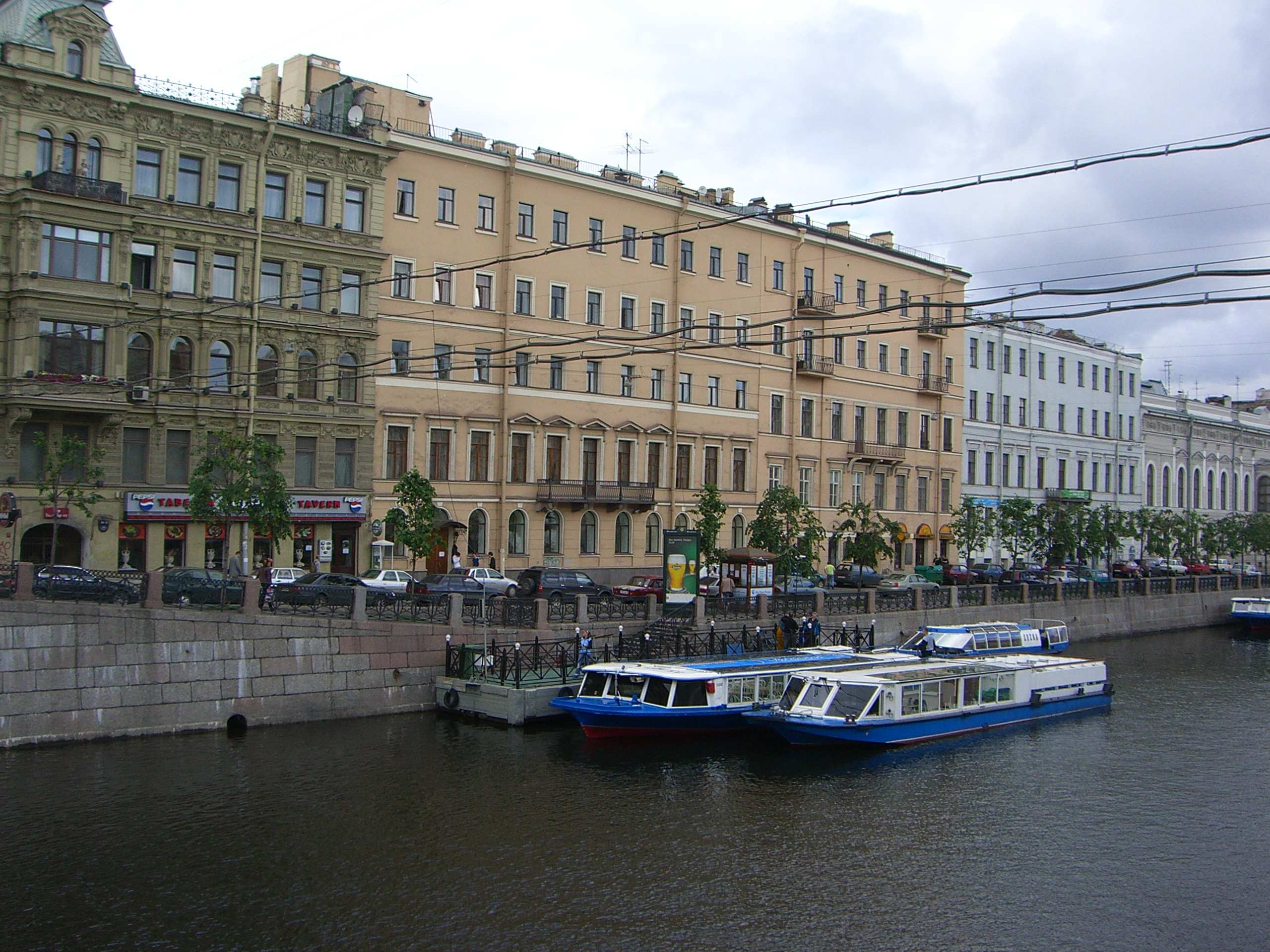
POMI office building at 27, Fontanka River embankment, St. Petersburg

The St. Petersburg Department of Steklov Institute of Mathematics of the Russian Academy of Sciences (Russian: Санкт-Петербургское отделение Математического института им. В. А. Стеклова РАН, abbreviated ПОМИ (PDMI) for "Петербургское отделение Математического института", Petersburg Department of the Mathematical Institute; PDMI) is a mathematical research institute in St. Petersburg, part of the Russian Academy of Sciences. Until 1992 it was known as Leningrad Department of Steklov Institute of Mathematics of the USSR Academy of Sciences (ЛОМИ, LOMI).

The name of the institution is a historical tradition and since 1995 it has no subordination to the Steklov Institute of Mathematics.

The institute was established in 1940 as a department of the Steklov Institute and is named after Vladimir Andreevich Steklov, a Soviet/Russian mathematician, mechanician and physicist.

== Directors ==
- V. A. Tartakovskii (1940–1941)
- Andrey Markov, Jr. (1942–1953)
- Nikolai Erugin (1953–1957)
- Georgii Petrashen' (1957–1976)
- Ludvig Faddeev (1976–2000)
- Ildar Abdulovich Ibragimov (2000–2006)
- Sergei Kislyakov (2007–2021)
- Maxim Vsemirnov (2021–present)

== Notable researchers ==
- Aleksandr Danilovich Aleksandrov
- Yuri Burago
- Nikolai Durov
- Dmitry Konstantinovich Faddeev
- Vera Faddeeva
- Fedor Fomin
- Leonid Kantorovich
- Vladimir Korepin
- Olga Ladyzhenskaya
- Yuri Linnik
- Yuri Matiyasevich
- Grigori Perelman worked at this institution when he proved the Poincaré conjecture.
- Fedor Petrov
- Nicolai Reshetikhin
- Nikolai Aleksandrovich Shanin
- Samson Shatashvili
- Andrei Suslin
- Leon Takhtajan
- Anatoly Vershik
- Alexander Volberg
- Oleg Viro
- Victor Zalgaller
