= Sergei Ivanov (mathematician) =

Russian mathematician (born 1972)

Sergei Vladimirovich Ivanov
- Born: May 31, 1972
- Education: Saint Petersburg State University
- Awards: Gold medal in the International Mathematical Olympiad, 1987, 1988, 1989; Leroy P. Steele Prize
- Scientific career
- Workplaces: Steklov Institute of Mathematics
- Doctoral advisor: Yuri Burago

Sergei Vladimirovich Ivanov (Сергей Владимирович Иванов; born 31 May 1972) is a leading Russian mathematician working in differential geometry and mathematical physics.

== Education and career ==
For each of the three years, 1987, 1988, and 1989, Ivanov won a gold medal in the International Mathematical Olympiad. He studied at the Saint Petersburg State University, where he received his Ph.D. (Candidate of Sciences) with advisor Yuri Burago. Ivanov has worked for many years at the Steklov Institute of Mathematics. There in 2009 he habilitated (Doktor nauk).

In 2014, he received, jointly with Yuri Burago and Dmitri Burago, the Leroy P. Steele Prize for their book A course in metric geometry published by the American Mathematical Society in 2001.

In addition to his research on differential geometry, Ivanov also works on informatics.

In 2010, in Hyderabad he was an invited speaker with talk Volume comparison via boundary distances at the International Congress of Mathematicians. In December 2011, he was elected a corresponding member of the Russian Academy of Sciences.

== Selected publications ==
- Burago, Dmitri; Burago, Yuri; Ivanov, Sergei (2001), A Course in Metric Geometry, Graduate Studies in Mathematics, vol. 33, Providence, Rhode Island: American Mathematical Society, p. 415, ISBN 0-8218-2129-6, ISSN 1065-7339; published in Russian translation in 2004 with the title Курс метрической геометрии ISBN 5-93972-300-4
