= Varga K. Kalantarov =

Turkish mathematician

Varga K. Kalantarov (born 1950) is an Azerbaijani mathematician, scientist and professor of mathematics. He is a member of the Koç University Mathematics Department in Istanbul, Turkey.

== Education ==
Varga Kalantarov was born in 1950. He graduated from Baku State University in 1971. He received his PhD in Differential Equations and Mathematical Physics at the Baku Institute of Mathematics and Mechanics, Azerbaijan National Academy of Sciences in 1974.

He received his Doctor of Sciences degree in 1988 under the supervision of Olga Ladyzhenskaya at the Steklov Institute of Mathematics, Saint Petersburg, Russia.

== Academic career ==
After he received his PhD, he started to hold a scientific researcher position at the Baku Institute of Mathematics and Mechanics. Meanwhile, between 1975 and 1981, he was a visiting researcher at the Steklov Institute of Mathematics.

From 1989 to 1993 he was the head of the Department of Partial Differential Equations at the Baku Institute of Mathematics and Mechanics. After the perestroika era, he moved to Turkey with his family in 1993. Between 1993 and 2001, he was a full-time professor in Hacettepe University, Mathematics Department, Ankara. Starting in 2001, he became a full-time professor in Koç University.

He has been an active researcher, having published more than 70 scientific manuscripts with more than 2000 citations. He has had 17 PhD students.

== Research areas ==
His research interests include PDEs and dynamical systems.

=== Representative scientific publications ===
- Kalantarov, V. K.; Ladyženskaja, O. A. Formation of collapses in quasilinear equations of parabolic and hyperbolic types. (Russian) Boundary value problems of mathematical physics and related questions in the theory of functions, 10. Zap. Naučn. Sem. LOMI 69 (1977), 77-102, 274.
- Kalantarov, Varga K.; Titi, Edriss S. Global attractors and determining modes for the 3D Navier-Stokes-Voight equations. Chin. Ann. Math. Ser. B 30 (2009), no. 6, 697–714.
- Kalantarov, Varga; Zelik, Sergey Finite-dimensional attractors for the quasi-linear strongly-damped wave equation. J. Differential Equations 247 (2009), no. 4, 1120–1155.
