= Evdokimov's algorithm =

Algorithm for factorization of polynomials

In computational number theory, Evdokimov's algorithm, named after Sergei Evdokimov, is an algorithm for factorization of polynomials over finite fields. It was the fastest algorithm known for this problem, from its publication in 1994 until 2020. It can factorize a one-variable polynomial of degree $n$ over an explicitly given finite field of cardinality $q$. Assuming the generalized Riemann hypothesis the algorithm runs in deterministic time $(n^{\log n}\log q)^{{\mathcal O}(1)}$ (see Big O notation). This is an improvement of both Berlekamp's algorithm and Rónyai's algorithm in the sense that the first algorithm is polynomial for small characteristic of the field, whearas the second one is polynomial for small $n$; however, both of them are exponential if no restriction is made.

The factorization of a polynomial $f$ over a ground field $k$ is reduced to the case when $f$ has no multiple roots and is completely splitting over $k$ (i.e. $f$ has $n$ distinct roots in $k$). In order to find a root of $f$ in this case, the algorithm deals with polynomials not only over the ground field $k$ but also over a completely splitting semisimple algebra over $k$ (an example of such an algebra is given by $k[X]/(f) = k[A]$, where $A = X\bmod f$). The main problem here is to find efficiently a nonzero zero-divisor in the algebra. The GRH is used only to take roots in finite fields in polynomial time. Thus the Evdokimov algorithm, in fact, solves a polynomial equation over a finite field "by radicals" in quasipolynomial time.

The analyses of Evdokimov's algorithm is closely related with some problems in the association scheme theory. With the help of this approach, it was proved that if $n$ is a prime and $n-1$ has a ‘large’ $r$-smooth divisor $s$, then a modification of the Evdokimov algorithm finds a nontrivial factor of the polynomial $f$ in deterministic $\operatorname{poly}(n^r,\log q)$ time, assuming GRH and that $s=\Omega\left(\sqrt{n/2^r}\,\right)$.
