= Anastasia Stavrova =

Russian mathematician

Anastasia Konstantinovna Stavrova (Russian: Анастасия Константиновна Ставрова) is a Russian mathematician specializing in algebraic groups, non-associative algebra, and algebraic K-theory. She is a researcher in the Chebyshev Laboratory at Saint Petersburg State University.

== Education and career ==
Stavrova earned a specialist degree in mathematics at Saint Petersburg State University in 2005. After traveling to the University of Leiden and University of Padua for an Algant master's degree, which she completed in 2007, she returned to Saint Petersburg State University for her doctoral studies. Her 2009 dissertation, Structure of Isotropic Reductive Groups, was supervised by Nikolai Vavilov.

She returned to Saint Petersburg State University as a researcher, after doing postdoctoral research from 2010 to 2012 at LMU Munich and the University of Duisburg-Essen in Germany, and in 2013 as the Jerrold E. Marsden Postdoctoral Fellow at the Fields Institute in Canada.

== Recognition ==
Stavrova won the Young Mathematician Prize of the Saint Petersburg Mathematical Society in 2009, and the Young Russian Mathematics Scholarship in 2016. In 2018, she won the G. de B. Robinson Award of the Canadian Mathematical Society.
