= Alexandrov's soap bubble theorem =

Alexandrov's soap bubble theorem is a mathematical theorem from geometric analysis that characterizes a sphere through the mean curvature. The theorem was proven in 1958 by Alexander Danilovich Alexandrov. In his proof he introduced the method of moving planes, which was used after by many mathematicians successfully in geometric analysis.

== Soap bubble theorem ==
Let $\Omega\subset \mathbb{R}^n$ be a bounded connected domain with a boundary $\Gamma=\partial\Omega$ that is of class $C^2$ with a constant mean curvature, then $\Gamma$ is a sphere.

== Literature ==
- Ciraolo, Giulio; Roncoroni, Alberto (2018). "The method of moving planes: a quantitative approach". arXiv:1811.05202 [math.AP].
- Smirnov, Yurii Mikhailovich; Aleksandrov, Alexander Danilovich (1962). "Nine Papers on Topology, Lie Groups, and Differential Equations". American Mathematical Society Translations. 2. Vol. 21. American Mathematical Soc. ISBN 0821817213.
