= Dmitri Burago =

Russian mathematician

Dmitri Yurievich Burago (Russian: Дмитрий Юрьевич Бураго, born May 17, 1964) is a leading Russian-American mathematician, specializing in differential, Riemannian, Finsler geometry, geometric analysis, dynamical systems, and applications to mathematical physics.

He is the son of the celebrated Geometer and Russian mathematician Yuri Burago, with whom he also published well known book on metric geometry. Burago studied at 45th Physics-Mathematics School. Burago received his doctorate in 1994 at Saint Petersburg State University under the supervision of Anatoly Vershik. He was at the Steklov Institute in Saint Petersburg and is now a professor at Pennsylvania State University's Center for Dynamical Systems and Geometry.

In 1992, he was awarded the prize of the Saint Petersburg Mathematical Society. In 1998, he was an Invited Speaker at the International Congress of Mathematicians in Berlin. In 2014, he was awarded the Leroy P. Steele Prize with Yuri Burago and Sergei Vladimirovich Ivanov for their book A course in metric geometry.

== Selected publications ==
=== Articles ===
- Burago, D. (1994), Kuksin, S.; Lazutkin, V.; Pöschel, J. (eds.), "Periodic Metrics", Seminar on Dynamical Systems, Basel: Birkhäuser Basel, pp. 90–95, doi:10.1007/978-3-0348-7515-8_7, ISBN 978-3-0348-7517-2
- Burago, D.; Ivanov, S. (May 1994). "Riemannian tori without conjugate points are flat". Geometric and Functional Analysis. 4 (3): 259–269. doi:10.1007/BF01896241. ISSN 1016-443X.
- Burago, D.; Ivanov, S.; Kleiner, B. (1997). "On the structure of the stable norm of periodic metrics". Mathematical Research Letters. 4 (6): 791–808. doi:10.4310/MRL.1997.v4.n6.a2.
- Burago, Dmitri; Ivanov, Sergei; Department ofMathematics, The Pennsylvania State University, University Park, PA 16802; Steklov Math. Institute, 27, Fontanka, St. Petersburg 191023 (2008). "Partially hyperbolic diffeomorphisms of 3-manifolds with Abelian fundamental groups". Journal of Modern Dynamics. 2 (4): 541–580. doi:10.3934/jmd.2008.2.541. ISSN 1930-532X.
- Burago, D.; Ivanov, S.; Polterovich, L. (2007-10-07). "Conjugation-invariant norms on groups of geometric origin". arXiv:0710.1412 [math.GR].

=== Books ===
- Burago, Dmitri (2001). A course in metric geometry. I︠U︡ D. Burago, Sergeĭ Ivanov. Providence, RI: American Mathematical Society. ISBN 978-0-8218-2129-9. OCLC 45873761.
