= Lynn Harold Loomis =

American mathematician (1915–1994)

Lynn Harold Loomis (April 25, 1915 – June 9, 1994) was an American mathematician working on analysis. Together with Hassler Whitney, he discovered the Loomis–Whitney inequality.

Loomis received his PhD in 1942 from Harvard University under Salomon Bochner with thesis Some Studies on Simply-Connected Riemann Surfaces: I. The Problem of Imbedding II. Mapping on the Boundary for Two Classes of Surfaces. After completing his PhD, Loomis was a professor at Radcliffe College and from 1949 at Harvard. From 1956, he was a member of the American Academy of Arts and Sciences.

== Selected works ==
=== Articles ===
- Loomis, Lynn H. (1942). "On an inequality of Seidel and Walsh". Bull. Amer. Math. Soc. 48 (12): 908–911. doi:10.1090/s0002-9904-1942-07820-7. MR 0008629.
- Loomis, Lynn H. (1943). "The converse of the Fatou theorem for positive harmonic functions". Trans. Amer. Math. Soc. 53 (2): 239–250. doi:10.1090/s0002-9947-1943-0007832-1. MR 0007832.
- Loomis, Lynn H. (1944). "A short proof of the completeness of the Laguerre functions". Bull. Amer. Math. Soc. 50 (6): 386–387. doi:10.1090/s0002-9904-1944-08151-2. MR 0010222.
- Loomis LH (1946). "On a theorem of von Neumann". Proc Natl Acad Sci U S A. 32 (8): 213–215. Bibcode:1946PNAS...32..213L. doi:10.1073/pnas.32.8.213. PMC 1078923. PMID 16578206.
- Loomis, Lynn H. (1946). "A note on the Hilbert transform". Bull. Amer. Math. Soc. 52 (12): 1082–1086. doi:10.1090/s0002-9904-1946-08713-3. MR 0019155.
- with Hassler Whitney: Loomis, L. H.; Whitney, H. (1949). "An inequality related to the isoperimetric inequality". Bull. Amer. Math. Soc. 55 (10): 961–962. doi:10.1090/S0002-9904-1949-09320-5. MR 0031538.

=== Books ===
- Introduction to Abstract Harmonic Analysis, Van Nostrand 1953
- with Shlomo Sternberg Advanced Calculus, Addison-Wesley 1968 (revised 1990, Jones and Bartlett; reprinted 2014, World Scientific) [a challenging text for (first-year) undergraduate students treating calculus on Banach spaces and differentiable manifolds; see Math 55]
- Introduction to Calculus, Addison-Wesley 1975
- Calculus, Addison-Wesley 1974, 1982
