= Kovalevskaya Prize =

Scientific award in Russia

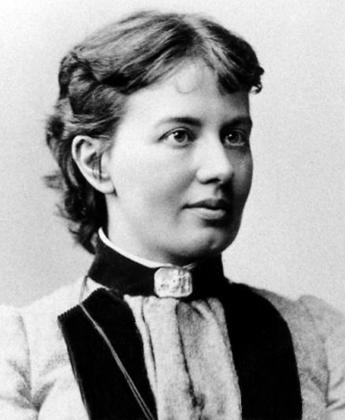
- Sofia Kovalevskaya in 1888
- Awarded for: outstanding achievements in mathematics
- Country: Russia
- Presented by: Russian Academy of Sciences
- Reward: A diploma
- First award: 1992; 34 years ago
- Number of laureates: 11 laureates (as of 2021)
- Website: http://www.ras.ru/about/awards/awdlist.aspx?awdid=59

The Kovalevskaya Prize (Russian: Премия имени С. В. Ковалевской) is a national scientific prize awarded by the Russian Academy of Sciences for outstanding achievements in mathematics since 1997 in honor of Sofya Kovalevskaya.

== Kovalevskaya Prize winners ==
- O. A. Ladyzhenskaya, 1992
- N. M. Ivochkina, 1997
- V. V. Kozlov, 1999
- G. A. Seregin, 2003
- S. V. Manakov and V. V. Sokolov, 2007
- A. B. Bogatyrev, 2009
- A. V. Borisov and I. S. Mamaev, 2012
- A. I. Bufetov, 2015
- I. A. Taimanov, 2018
- I. G. Goryacheva, 2024
