= Vladimir Buslaev =

Russian mathematical physicist

Vladimir Savel'evich Buslaev (Владимир Савельевич Буслаев, 19 April 1937, Leningrad – 14 March 2012) was a Russian mathematical physicist.

== Education ==
Buslajew received his Ph.D. (Russian candidate degree) in 1963 from the University of Leningrad under Olga Ladyzhenskaya with thesis Short-Wave Asymptotics of Diffraction Problems in Convex Domains. He was a professor at Saint Petersburg State University.

== Contributions ==
He did research on mathematical problems of diffraction and the WKB method.

== Recognition ==
In 1963 he received the prize of the Leningrad Mathematical Society.

In 1983 he was an invited speaker at the International Congress of Mathematicians in Warsaw and gave a talk Regularization of many particle scattering. He received an honorary doctorate from the Université Paris Nord. In 2000 he received the State Prize of the Russian Federation and he was an Honoured Scientist of the Russian Federation. In 2000 he gave a plenary lecture (Adiabatic perturbations of linear periodic problems) at the annual meeting of the German Mathematical Society in Dresden.

He was awarded a 2000 State Prize of the Russian Federation for "Asymptotic Methods of Studying the Equations of Mathematical Physics", along with Mikhail Karasev and Arlen Ilyin. (see list)

== Selected publications ==
- with Vladimir Borisovich Matveev: Buslaev, V. S.; Matveev, V. B. (1970). "Wave operators for the Schrödinger equation with a slowly decreasing potential". Teoreticheskaya I Matematicheskaya Fizika. 2 (3): 367–376. Bibcode:1970TMP.....2..266B. doi:10.1007/BF01038047. S2CID 121852629.
- Buslaev, V. S. (1987). "Semiclassical approximation for equations with periodic coefficients". Russian Mathematical Surveys. 42 (6): 97–125. Bibcode:1987RuMaS..42...97B. doi:10.1070/RM1987v042n06ABEH001502. S2CID 250803586.
- with Vincenzo Grecchi: Buslaev, V.; Grecchi, V. (1993). "Equivalence of unstable anharmonic oscillators and double wells". Journal of Physics A: Mathematical and General. 26 (20): 5541–5549. Bibcode:1993JPhA...26.5541B. doi:10.1088/0305-4470/26/20/035.
- with Catherine Sulem: Buslaev, Vladimir S.; Sulem, Catherine (2003). "On asymptotic stability of solitary waves for nonlinear Schrödinger equations". Annales de l'Institut Henri Poincaré C. 20 (3): 419–475. Bibcode:2003AIHPC..20..419B. doi:10.1016/S0294-1449(02)00018-5.
