= Nina Uraltseva =

Russian mathematician

- Born: Nina Nikolaevna Uraltseva
- Education: Saint Petersburg State University

Nina Nikolaevna Uraltseva (born 1934, Russian: Нина Николаевна Уральцева) is a Russian mathematician, a professor of mathematics and head of the department of mathematical physics at Saint Petersburg State University, and the editor-in-chief of the Proceedings of the St. Petersburg Mathematical Society. Her specialty is the study of nonlinear partial differential equations.

Nina Uraltseva was born on 24 May 1934 in Leningrad, USSR (currently St. Petersburg, Russia), to parents Nikolai Fedorovich Uraltsev, (an engineer) and Lidiya Ivanovna Zmanovskaya (a school physics teacher). She received a diploma in physics from Saint Petersburg State University (then known as Leningrad State University) in 1956. She earned a Ph.D. in 1960 from the same university, under the supervision of Olga Ladyzhenskaya, and completed her D.Sc. (the Soviet equivalent of a habilitation) in 1964. She joined the faculty of Leningrad State University in 1959, and was promoted to professor in 1968 and department head in 1974.

Uraltseva's research on Hilbert's nineteenth problem and Hilbert's twentieth problem led to her recognition in 1967 by the Chebyshev Prize of the USSR Academy of Sciences, and in 1969 by the USSR State Prize. Uraltseva was a speaker at the 1970 and 1986 International Congress of Mathematicians. A meeting on partial differential equations was held in honor of her 70th birthday at the Royal Institute of Technology, Stockholm, in June 2005, and in 2006 the Royal Institute of Technology gave her an honorary doctorate. For her 75th birthday, a book on partial differential equations and a special issue of the journal Problemy Matematicheskogo Analiza were dedicated to her. A special issue of the journal Algebra i Analiz commemorated her 85th birthday.
