= Juliette Kennedy =

Mathematician

- Education: City University of New York
- Spouse: Jouko Väänänen
- Scientific career
- Fields: mathematical logic, set theory, foundations of mathematics, philosophy of mathematics, Kurt Gödel
- Workplaces: Helsinki University
- Thesis: On Embedding Models of Arithmetic into Reduced Powers (1996)
- Doctoral advisor: Attila Mate

Juliette Kennedy is an associate professor in the Department of Mathematics and Statistics at the University of Helsinki. Her main research interests are mathematical logic and the foundations of mathematics. In the course of her work, she has published extensively on the works of Kurt Gödel.

== Education and career ==
Kennedy is an associate professor in the Department of Mathematics and Statistics at the University of Helsinki.

== Research areas ==
Kennedy's research at the University of Helsinki focuses on mathematical logic in the area of set-theoretic model theory and set theory. In the course of her mathematical work, she also researches the history of mathematics and the foundations of mathematics. In this context she has sustained an extensive project to place the works of Kurt Gödel in its historical and foundational context. In 2017 she published her research on the interplay between the works of Alan Turing and that of Gödel, who in 1956 defined the P versus NP problem in a letter to John von Neumann.

== Books ==
Kennedy and Roman Kossak are the editors of Set Theory, Arithmetic, and Foundations of Mathematics: Theorems, Philosophies, published as Book 36 in the series Lecture Notes in Logic in 2012 by Cambridge University Press.

Kennedy is the editor of Interpreting Gödel: Critical Essays, published in 2014 by Cambridge University Press and reprinted in 2017. In the book, Kennedy brought together leading contemporary philosophers and mathematicians to explore the impact of Gödel's work on the foundations and philosophy of mathematics. The logician Kurt Gödel has in 1931 formulated the incompleteness theorems, which among other things prove that within any formal system with resources sufficient to code arithmetic, questions exist which are neither provable nor disprovable on the basis of the axioms which define the system.
