= Jouko Väänänen =

Jouko Antero Väänänen
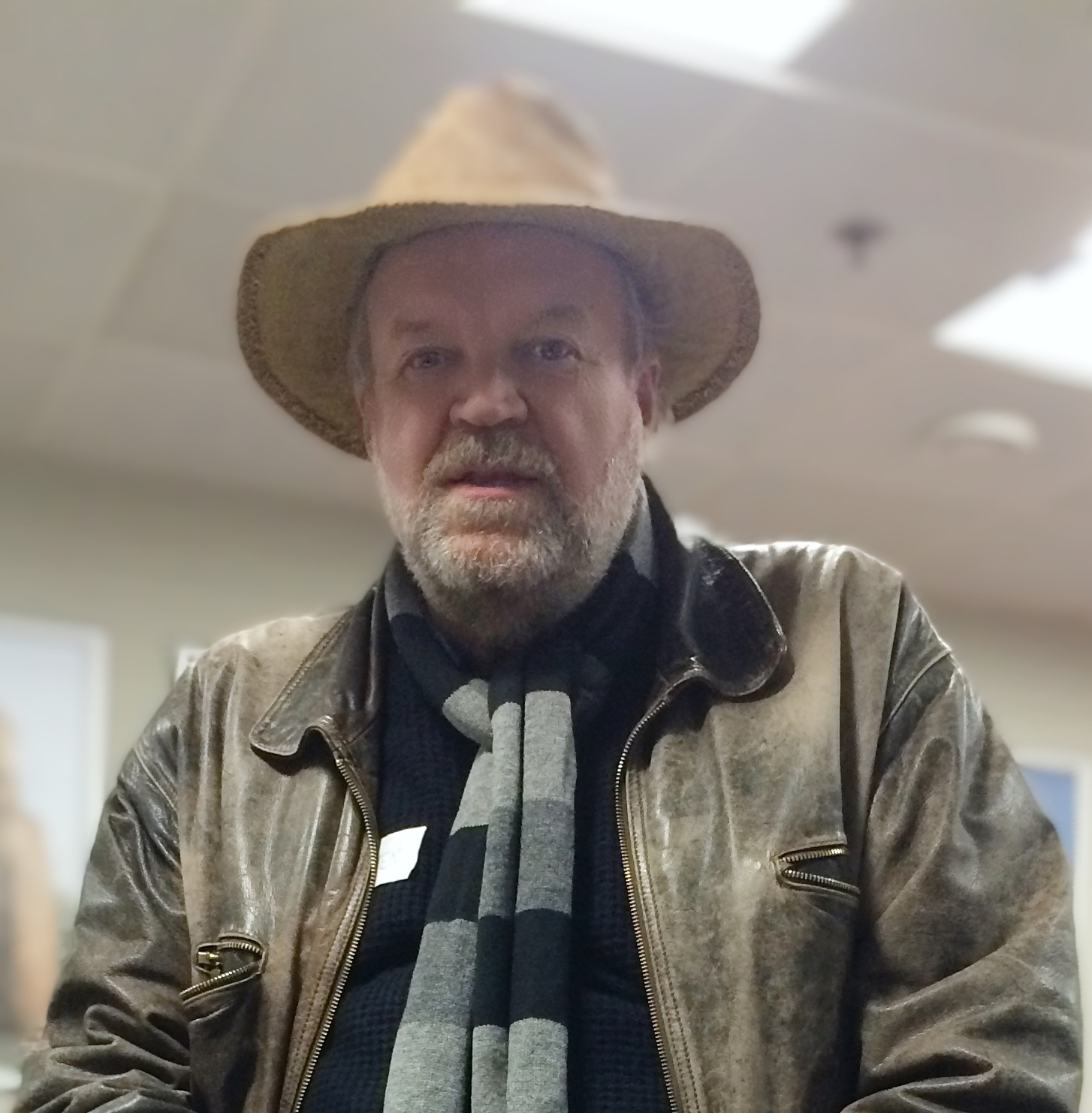
- Born: September 3, 1950 (age 75); Rovaniemi, Lapland
- Citizenship: Finnish
- Education: University of Manchester
- Known for: Dependence logic, abstract model theory, set theory
- Spouse: Juliette Kennedy
- Scientific career
- Fields: mathematical logic
- Workplaces: University of Helsinki, Amsterdam University
- Thesis: Applications of set theory to generalized quantifiers (1977)
- Doctoral advisor: Peter Aczel

Jouko Antero Väänänen (born September 3, 1950 in Rovaniemi, Lapland) is a Finnish mathematical logician known for his contributions to set theory, model theory, logic and foundations of mathematics. He served as the vice-rector at the University of Helsinki, and a professor of mathematics at the University of Helsinki, as well as a professor of mathematical logic and foundations of mathematics at the University of Amsterdam. He completed his PhD at the University of Manchester under the supervision of Peter Aczel in 1977 with the PhD thesis Applications of Set Theory to Generalized Quantifiers. He was elected to the Finnish Academy of Science and Letters in 2002. He served as a member of the Senate of the University of Helsinki from 2004 to 2006 and the Treasurer of the European Mathematical Society from 2007 to 2014, as well as the Treasurer of the European Set Theory Society since 2012. Jouko Väänänen received the Magnus Ehrnrooth Foundation Prize in mathematics on April 29, 2024.

== Publications ==
=== Books ===
- Dependence Logic, Cambridge University Press, 2007.
- Models and Games, Cambridge University Press, 2011.

== See also ==
- Dependence logic
