= Olga Ladyzhenskaya =

Russian mathematician (1922–2004)

- Ольга Ладыженская
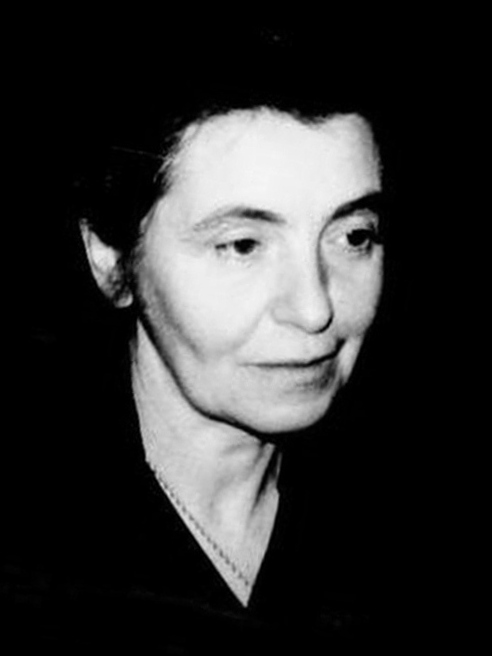
- Ladyzhenskaya in 1976
- Born: Olga Aleksandrovna Ladyzhenskaya; 7 March 1922; Kologriv, Russian SFSR
- Died: 12 January 2004 (aged 81); Saint Petersburg, Russia
- Education: Moscow University
- Known for: Finite difference method for the Navier–Stokes equations Hilbert's nineteenth problem Ladyzhenskaya–Babuška–Brezzi condition Ladyzhenskaya's inequality
- Awards: Lomonosov Gold Medal (2002); John von Neumann Prize (1998); Noether Lecture (1994); Kovalevskaya Prize (1992); USSR State Prize (1969)
- Scientific career
- Fields: Partial differential equations
- Workplaces: Saint Petersburg University
- Doctoral advisor: Ivan Petrovsky; Sergei Sobolev
- Notable students: Vladimir Buslaev; Ludvig Faddeev; Varga K. Kalantarov; Nina Uraltseva

Olga Aleksandrovna Ladyzhenskaya (Russian: Ольга Александровна Ладыженская, IPA: [ˈolʲɡə ɐlʲɪˈksandrəvnə ɫɐˈdɨʐɨnskəɪ̯ə]; 7 March 1922 – 12 January 2004) was a Russian mathematician who worked on partial differential equations, fluid dynamics, and the finite-difference method for the Navier–Stokes equations. She received the Lomonosov Gold Medal in 2002. She authored more than two hundred scientific publications, including six monographs.

== Biography ==
Ladyzhenskaya was born and grew up in the small town of Kologriv, the daughter of a mathematics teacher who is credited with her early inspiration and love of mathematics. The artist Gennady Ladyzhensky was her grandfather's brother, also born in this town. In 1937 her father, Aleksandr Ivanovich Ladýzhenski, was arrested by the NKVD and executed as an "enemy of the people".

Ladyzhenskaya completed high school in 1939, unlike her older sisters who weren't permitted to do the same. She was not admitted to the Leningrad State University due to her father's status and attended a pedagogical institute. After the German invasion of June 1941, she taught school in Kologriv. She was eventually admitted to Moscow State University in 1943 and graduated in 1947.

She began teaching in the Physics department of the university in 1950 and defended her PhD there, in 1951, under Sergei Sobolev and Vladimir Smirnov. She received a second doctorate from the Moscow State University in 1953. In 1954, she joined the mathematical physics laboratory of the Steklov Institute and became its head in 1961.

Ladyzhenskaya had a love of arts and storytelling, counting writer Aleksandr Solzhenitsyn and poet Anna Akhmatova among her friends. Like Solzhenitsyn she was religious. She was once a member of the city council, and engaged in philanthropic activities, repeatedly risking her personal safety and career to aid people opposed to the Soviet regime. Ladyzhenskaya suffered from various eye problems in her later years and relied on special pencils to do her work.

Two days before a trip to Florida, she died in her sleep in Russia on 12 January 2004.

== Mathematical accomplishments ==
Ladyzhenskaya is known for her work on partial differential equations (especially Hilbert's nineteenth problem) and fluid dynamics. She provided the first rigorous proofs of the convergence of a finite difference method for the Navier–Stokes equations.

She analyzed the regularity of parabolic equations, with Vsevolod A. Solonnikov and her student Nina Ural'tseva, and the regularity of quasilinear elliptic equations.

She wrote a student thesis under Ivan Petrovsky and was on the shortlist for the 1958 Fields Medal, ultimately awarded to Klaus Roth and René Thom.

== Publications ==
- Ladyzhenskaya, O.A. (1969) [1963], The Mathematical Theory of Viscous Incompressible Flow, Mathematics and Its Applications, vol. 2 (Revised Second ed.), New York; London; Paris; Montreux; Tokyo; Melbourne: Gordon and Breach, pp. xviii+224, MR 0254401, Zbl 0184.52603.
- Ladyženskaja, O.A.; Solonnikov, V.A.; Ural'ceva, N.N. (1968), Linear and quasi-linear equations of parabolic type, Translations of Mathematical Monographs, vol. 23, Providence, RI: American Mathematical Society, pp. xi+648, ISBN 978-0-8218-8653-3, MR 0241821, Zbl 0174.15403.
- Ladyzhenskaya, Olga A.; Ural'tseva, Nina N. (1968), Linear and Quasilinear Elliptic Equations, Mathematics in Science and Engineering, vol. 46, New York and London: Academic Press, pp. xviii+495, ISBN 978-0-08-095554-4, MR 0244627, Zbl 0164.13002.
- Ladyzhenskaya, O.A. (1985), The Boundary Value Problems of Mathematical Physics, Applied Mathematical Sciences, vol. 49, Berlin; Heidelberg; New York: Springer Verlag, pp. xxx+322, doi:10.1007/978-1-4757-4317-3, ISBN 978-0-521-39922-7, MR 0793735, Zbl 0588.35003 (Translated by Jack Lohwater).
- Ladyzhenskaya, O.A. (1991), Attractors for Semigroups and Evolution Equations, Lezioni Lincee, Cambridge: Cambridge University Press, pp. xi+73, doi:10.1017/CBO9780511569418, ISBN 978-0-521-39922-7, MR 1133627, S2CID 51684720, Zbl 0755.47049

== Awards and recognitions ==
- P. L. Chebyshev Prize (with Nina Nikolayevna Ural'tseva ) (1966) for the work "Linear and quasilinear equations of elliptic type"
- USSR State Prize (1969)
- Member of Lincei National Academy in Rome (1989)
- Member of the Russian Academy of Sciences (1990)
- Kovalevskaya Prize (1992) for the series of works "Attractors for Semigroups and Evolution Equations"
- ICM Emmy Noether Lecture (1994)
- John von Neumann Lecture (1998)
- Order of Friendship (1999)
- Lomonosov Gold Medal (2002) for outstanding achievements in the field of the theory of partial differential equations and mathematical physics
- On 7 March 2019, the 97th anniversary of Ladyzhenskaya's birth, the search engine Google released a Google Doodle commemorating her. The accompanying comment read, "Today's Doodle celebrates Olga Ladyzhenskaya, a Russian mathematician who triumphed over personal tragedy and obstacles to become one of the most influential thinkers of her generation."
- In 2022, the "Ladyzhenskaya Prize in Mathematical Physics" is created in her honor. It has been awarded for the first time on 2 July 2022 to Svetlana Jitomirskaya in a joint session at (WM)², World Meeting for Women in Mathematics and at the Probability and Mathematical Physics conference OAL Prize Winner 2022.

== See also ==
- Projection method (fluid dynamics)
