= Vladik Kreinovich =

American computer scientist

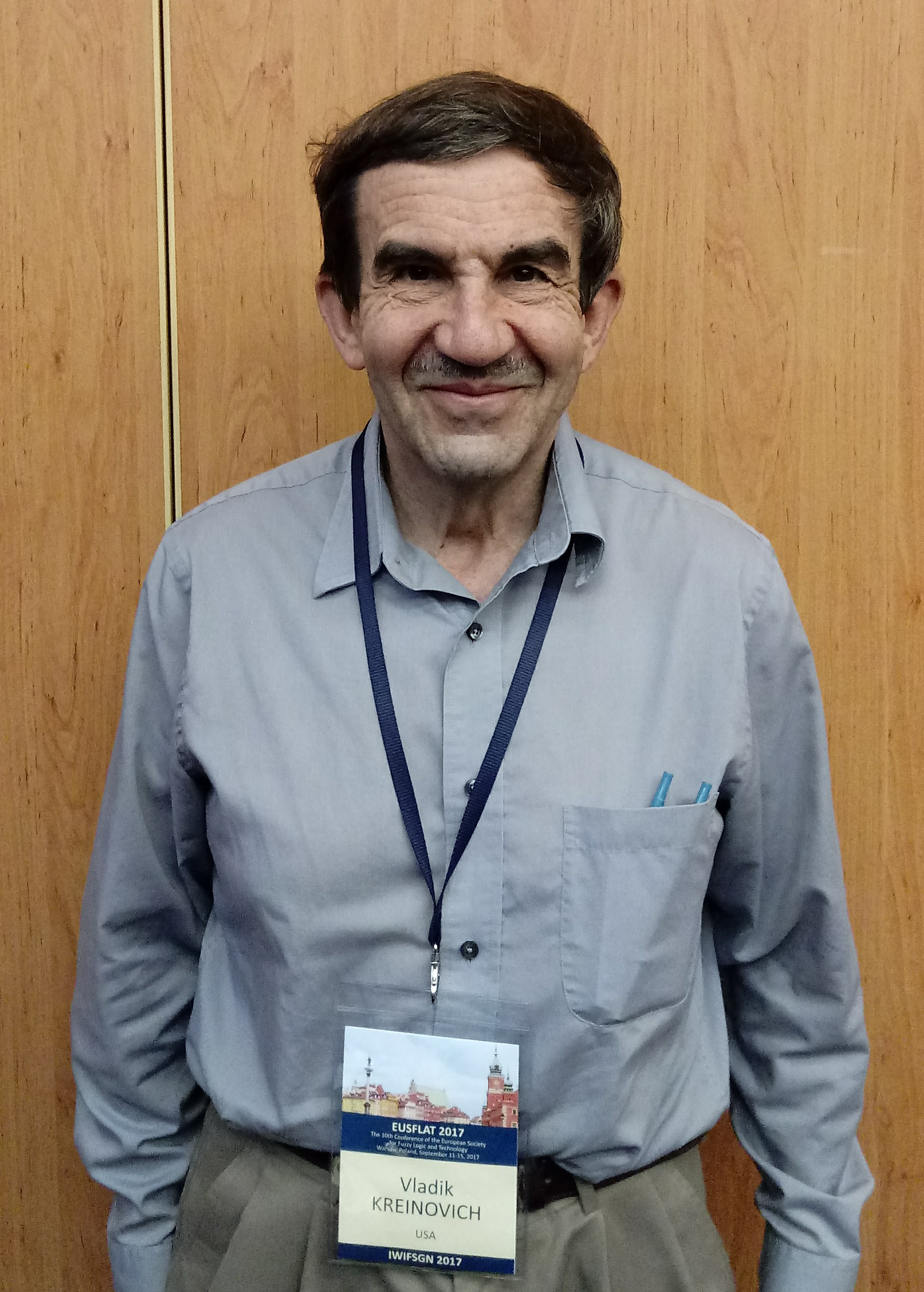
Prof. Vladik Kreinovich at the 10th EUSFLAT Conference, 12 September 2017, Warsaw, Poland

Vladik Kreinovich is a professor of computer science at the University of Texas at El Paso.

He was educated at Leningrad State University and received a doctorate in mathematics from the Sobolev Institute of Mathematics, affiliated with Novosibirsk State University in Novosibirsk.

His research spans several areas of computer science, computational statistics and computational mathematics generally, including interval arithmetic, fuzzy mathematics, probability theory, and probability bounds analysis. His research addresses computability issues, algorithm development, verification, and validated numerics for applications in uncertainty processing, data processing, intelligent control, geophysics and other engineering fields. In 2015, the Society For Design and Process Science gave him its Zadeh Award.

== Books ==
- Vladik Kreinovich (ed.), Uncertainty Modeling, Springer Verlag, Cham, Switzerland, 2017.
- Christian Servin and Vladik Kreinovich, Propagation of Interval and Probabilistic Uncertainty in Cyberinfrastructure-related Data Processing and Data Fusion, Springer Verlag, Berlin, Heidelberg, 2015.
- Hung T. Nguyen, Vladik Kreinovich, Berlin Wu, and Gang Xiang, Computing Statistics under Interval and Fuzzy Uncertainty, Springer Verlag, Berlin, Heidelberg, 2012.
- Vladik Kreinovich, Anatoly Lakeyev, Jiri Rohn, and Patrick Kahl, Computational complexity and feasibility of data processing and interval computations, Kluwer, Dordrecht, 1998.
- R. Baker Kearfott and Vladik Kreinovich (eds.). Applications of Interval Computations Kluwer, Dordrecht, 1996.

== Selected publications ==
- V. Kreinovich, "Solving equations (and systems of equations) under uncertainty: how different practical problems lead to different mathematical and computational formulations", Granular Computing, 2016, Vol. 1, No. 3, pp. 171–179.
- V. Kreinovich and S. Shary, "Interval methods for data fitting under uncertainty: a probabilistic treatment", Reliable Computing, 2016, Vol. 23, pp. 105–141.
- L. Thompson, A. Velasco, V. Kreinovich, "Construction of ShearWave models by applying multi-objective optimization to multiple geophysical data sets", In: G. O. Tost and O. Vasilieva (eds.), Analysis, Modelling, Optimization, and Numerical Techniques, Springer Verlag, Berlin, Heidelberg, 2015, pp. 309–326.
- A. Jalal-Kamali, M. S. Hossain, and V. Kreinovich, "How to Understand Connections Based on Big Data: From Cliques to Flexible Granules", In: S.-M. Chen et al. (eds.), Information Granularity, Big Data, and Computational Intelligence, Springer, Cham, 2015, pp. 63–87.
- V. Kreinovich, "Interval computations and interval-related statistical techniques", In: F. Pavese et al. (eds.), Advanced Mathematical and Computational Tools in Metrology and Testing, World Scientific, Singapore, 2015, pp. 38–49.
- V. Kreinovich, "Decision Making under Interval Uncertainty (and beyond)", In: P. Guo and W. Pedrycz (eds.), Human-Centric Decision-Making Models for Social Sciences, Springer Verlag, 2014, pp. 163–193.
- M. Beer, S. Ferson, and V. Kreinovich, "Imprecise probabilities in engineering analyses", Mechanical Systems and Signal Processing, 2013, Vol. 37, pp. 4–29.
- M. Stein, M. Beer, and V. Kreinovich, "Bayesian Approach for Inconsistent Information", Information Sciences, 2013, Vol. 245, No. 1, pp. 96–111.
