= Victor Zalgaller =

Russian-Israeli mathematician (1920–2020)

- Виктор Абрамович Залгаллер
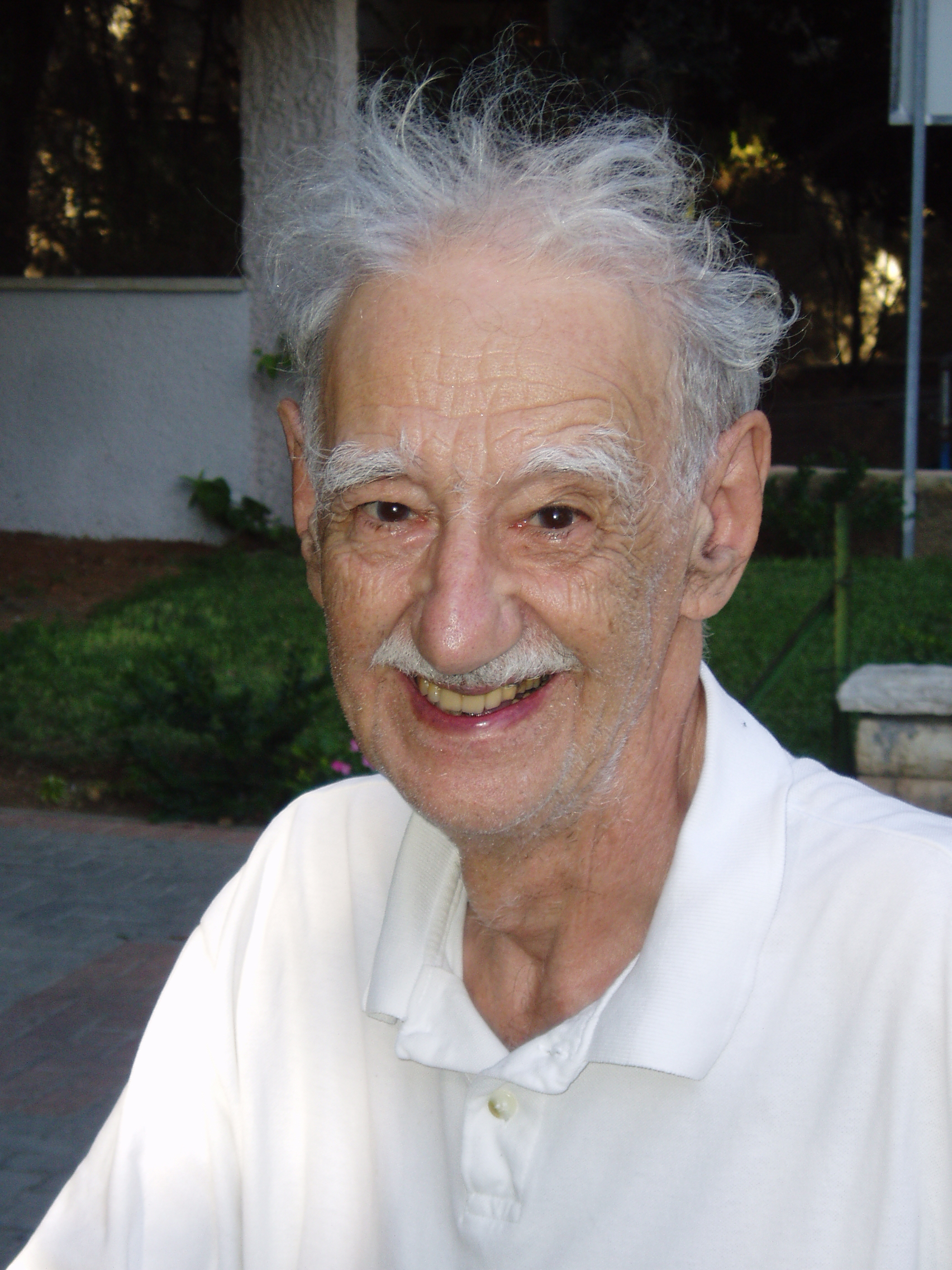
- V. A. Zalgaller, Rehovot, Israel, Sep. 2006
- Born: Victor Abramovich Zalgaller; 25 December 1920; Parfino, Novgorod, Russian SFSR
- Died: 2 October 2020 (aged 99); Israel
- Education: Leningrad State University
- Occupations: Mathematician, teacher
- Known for: Convex polyhedra, linear and dynamic programming, isoperimetry, differential geometry
- Notable work: Geometric Inequalities (with Yu. Burago)
- Scientific career
- Fields: Mathematics
- Workplaces: Leningrad State University, Steklov Institute of Mathematics, Saint Petersburg Lyceum 239
- Doctoral advisor: Aleksandr Aleksandrov; Leonid Kantorovich

Victor (Viktor) Abramovich Zalgaller (Hebrew: ויקטור אבּרמוביץ' זלגלר; Russian: Виктор Абрамович Залгаллер; 25 December 1920 – 2 October 2020) was a Russian-Israeli mathematician in the fields of geometry and optimization. He is best known for the results he achieved on convex polyhedra, linear and dynamic programming, isoperimetry, and differential geometry.

== Biography ==
Zalgaller was born in Parfino, Novgorod Governorate on 25 December 1920. In 1936, he was one of the winners of the Leningrad Mathematics Olympiads for high school students. He started his studies at the Leningrad State University, however, World War II intervened in 1941, and Zalgaller joined the Red Army. He took part in the defence of Leningrad, and in 1945 marched into Germany.

He worked as a teacher at the Saint Petersburg Lyceum 239, and received his 1963 doctoral dissertation on polyhedra with the aid of his high school students who wrote the computer programs for the calculation.

Zalgaller did his early work under direction of Aleksandr Aleksandrov and Leonid Kantorovich. He wrote joint monographs with both of them. His later monograph Geometric Inequalities (joint with Yuri Burago) is still the main reference in the field.

Zalgaller lived in Saint Petersburg most of his life, having studied and worked at the Leningrad State University and the Steklov Institute of Mathematics (Saint Petersburg branch).

In 1999, he immigrated to Israel. Zalgaller died on 2 October 2020 at the age of 99.
