= Yuri Burago =

Russian mathematician (born 1936)

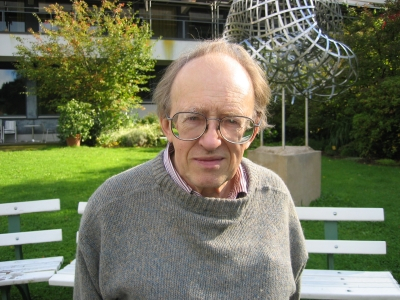
- Yuri D. Burago at Oberwolfach in 2006. Photo courtesy MFO.
- Born: 21 June 1936 (age 90)
- Education: St. Petersburg State University
- Awards: Leroy P. Steele Prize (2014)
- Scientific career
- Fields: Mathematics
- Workplaces: St. Petersburg State University
- Doctoral advisor: Victor Zalgaller; Aleksandr Aleksandrov
- Doctoral students: Sergei Ivanov; Grigori Perelman

Yuri Dmitrievich Burago (Russian: Ю́рий Дми́триевич Бура́го; born 21 June 1936) is a Russian mathematician. He works in differential and convex geometry.

== Early life, family and education ==
Burago studied at Leningrad University, where he obtained his Ph.D. and Habilitation degrees. His advisors were Victor Zalgaller and Aleksandr Aleksandrov.

== Career ==
Yuri Burago created what is known now as Alexandrov Geometry with his students Grigori Perelman and Petrunin, and M. Gromov. Also brought geometric inequalities to the state of art.

Burago is the head of the Laboratory of Geometry and Topology that is part of the St. Petersburg Department of Steklov Institute of Mathematics. He took part in a report for the United States Civilian Research and Development Foundation for the Independent States of the former Soviet Union.

== Books ==
Burago is the author of:

- Burago, Dmitri; Burago, Yuri; Ivanov, Sergei (2001). A Course in Metric Geometry. Graduate Studies in Mathematics. Vol. 33. Providence, Rhode Island: American Mathematical Society. doi:10.1090/gsm/033. ISBN 0-8218-2129-6. MR 1835418.
- Burago, Yu. D.; Zalgaller, V. A. (1994). Введение в риманову геометрию [An introduction to Riemannian geometry]. Moscow: Nauka. ISBN 5-02-024606-9. MR 1356465.
- Burago, Yu. D.; Zalgaller, V. A. (1988). Geometric Inequalities. Grundlehren der mathematischen Wissenschaften [Fundamental Principles of Mathematical Sciences]. Vol. 285. Translated by Sosinskiĭ, A. B. Berlin: Springer-Verlag. doi:10.1007/978-3-662-07441-1. ISBN 3-540-13615-0. MR 0936419. Translated from Геометрические неравенства, Nauka 1980.
- Burago, Yu. D. (1970). Isoperimetric inequalities in the theory of surfaces of bounded external curvature. Seminars in Mathematics, V. A. Steklov Mathematical Institute, Leningrad. Vol. 10. New York: Consultants Bureau. MR 0276905.
- Burago, Yu. D.; Maz'ya, V. G. (1969). Potential theory and function theory for irregular regions. Seminars in Mathematics, V. A. Steklov Mathematical Institute, Leningrad. Vol. 3. New York: Consultants Bureau. MR 0240284. Translated from Certain questions of potential theory and function theory for regions with irregular boundaries, LOMI 1967.

== Students ==
He has advised Grigori Perelman, who solved the Poincaré conjecture, one of the seven Millennium Prize Problems. Burago was an advisor to Perelman during the latter's post-graduate research at St. Petersburg Department of Steklov Institute of Mathematics.
