= Steklov Institute of Mathematics =

Russian research institute

Coordinates: 55°41′41″N 37°33′52″E

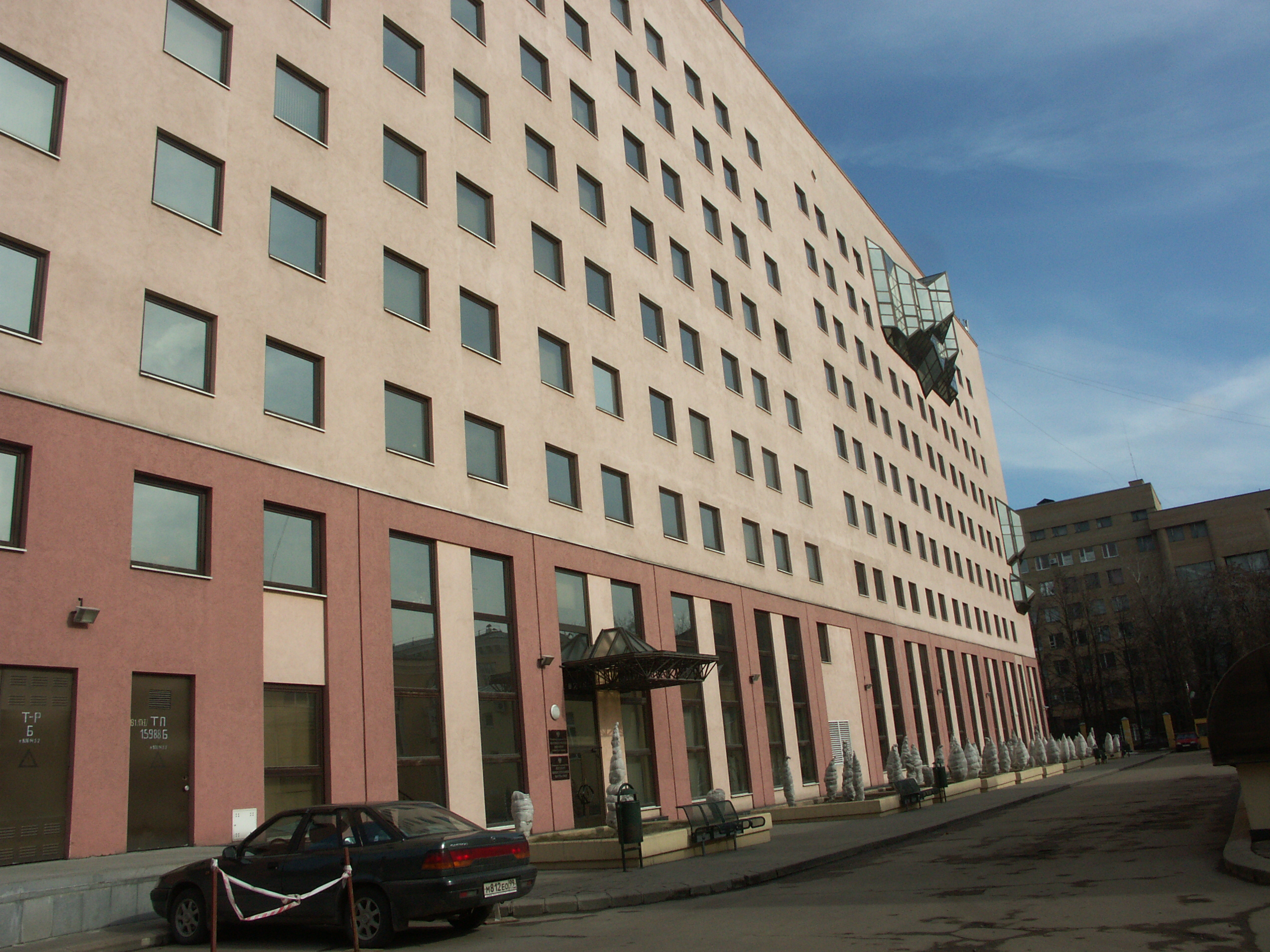
Steklov Institute of Mathematics

Steklov Institute of Mathematics or Steklov Mathematical Institute (Russian: Математический институт имени В.А.Стеклова) is a premier research institute based in Moscow, specialized in mathematics, and a part of the Russian Academy of Sciences. The institute is named after Vladimir Andreevich Steklov, who in 1919 founded the Institute of Physics and Mathematics in Leningrad. In 1934, this institute was split into separate parts for physics and mathematics, and the mathematical part became the Steklov Institute. At the same time, it was moved to Moscow. The first director of the Steklov Institute was Ivan Matveyevich Vinogradov. From 1961–1964, the institute's director was the notable mathematician Sergei Chernikov.

The old building of the Institute in Leningrad became its Department in Leningrad. Today, that department has become a separate institute, called the St. Petersburg Department of Steklov Mathematical Institute of the Russian Academy of Sciences or PDMI RAS, located in Saint Petersburg, Russia. The name St. Petersburg Department is misleading, however, because the St. Petersburg Department is now an independent institute. In 1966, the Moscow-based Keldysh Institute of Applied Mathematics (Russian: Институт прикладной математики им. М.В.Келдыша) split off from the Steklov Institute.
