= Rodney Baxter =

Australian physicist (1940–2025)

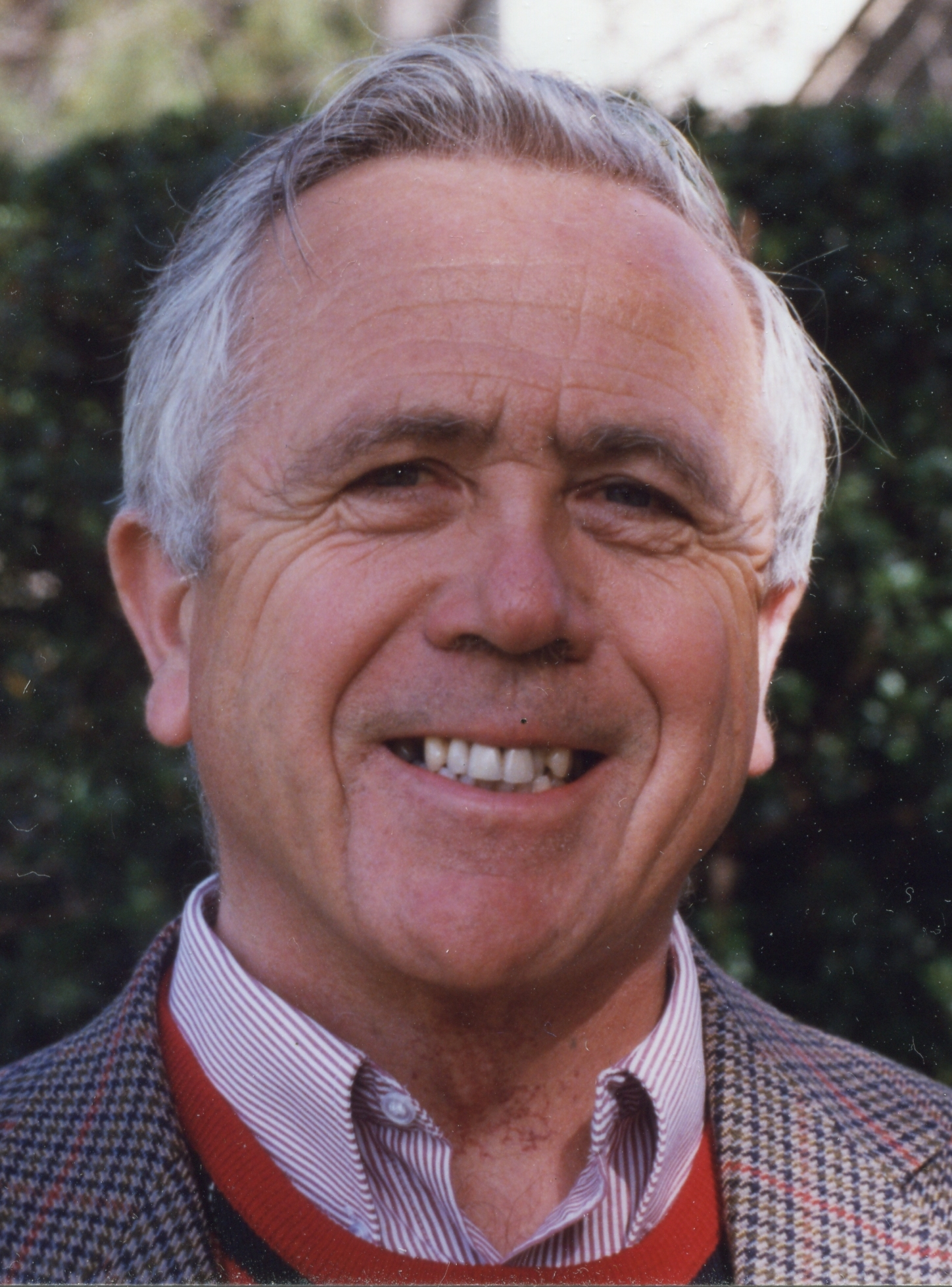
- Baxter in 1999
- Born: 8 February 1940; London, England
- Died: 20 July 2025 (aged 85); Canberra, Australia
- Education: Bancroft's School; Trinity College, Cambridge (BA, MA); Australian National University (PhD)
- Known for: Yang-Baxter equation Yang-Baxter operator
- Scientific career
- Fields: Theoretical Physics
- Workplaces: Iraq Petroleum Company (1964–1965); Massachusetts Institute of Technology (1968–1970); Isaac Newton Institute, Cambridge (1992); Australian National University (1970–2002)

Rodney James Baxter FRS FAA (8 February 1940 – 20 July 2025) was an Australian physicist, specialising in statistical mechanics. He is well known for his work in exactly solved models, in particular vertex models such as the six-vertex model and eight-vertex model, and the chiral Potts model and hard hexagon model. A recurring theme in the solution of such models, the Yang–Baxter equation, also known as the "star–triangle relation", is named in his honour.

== Early life and education ==
Rodney James Baxter was born on 8 February 1940.

He was educated at Bancroft's School and Trinity College, Cambridge (BA, MA), before relocating to the Australian National University in Canberra to complete his PhD. He was among the first doctoral graduates in theoretical physics from the ANU, graduating in 1964.

== Career ==
In 1964 and 1965, Baxter worked for the Iraq Petroleum Company.

He worked as an assistant professor at the Massachusetts Institute of Technology from 1968 until 1970, when he took up a position at the ANU, and served a term as the Head of the Department of Theoretical Physics in the Institute of Advanced Study, until he retired in 2002. He was Emeritus Professor of Physics.

== Research ==
Baxter gained recognition in 1971 when he used the star-triangle relation to calculate the free energy of the eight-vertex model, and went on to similarly solve the hard hexagon model (1980) and the chiral Potts model in 1988. He also developed the corner transfer matrix method for calculating the order parameters of the eight-vertex and similar models. In 2005 he used the method of Michio Jimbo, Tetsuji Miwa and Nakayashiki to verify Albertini, McCoy, Perk and Tang's conjecture for the order parameter of the chiral Potts model.

His use of the Yang–Baxter equation led to the formulation and the study of representations of the quantum group by Vladimir Drinfeld in the 1980s, and quantum generalisations of affine algebras, and they are quasi-triangular Hopf algebras which yield solutions of the Yang–Baxter equation and provide insight into the properties of corresponding statistical models.

His book, Exactly solved models in statistical mechanics, has received over 4000 citations (according to Web of Science) in subsequent work in statistical mechanics and the study of quantum groups, and is used widely in teaching at universities.

== Awards and honours ==
In 1984, Baxter was awarded an honorary Doctor of Science by Cambridge.

He was a Fellow of the Australian Academy of Science (1977), Royal Society of London (1982), and the Isaac Newton Institute, Cambridge, where he was Royal Society Research Professor in 1992.

Other awards include:

- Pawsey Medal, Australian Academy of Science, 1975
- Boltzmann Medal, IUPAP, 1980, a major award for research contribution concerning statistical mechanics
- Thomas Ranken Lyle Medal, Australian Academy of Science, 1983
- Dannie Heineman Prize for Mathematical Physics, American Physical Society, 1987
- Harrie Massey Medal and Prize, Australian Institute of Physics / Institute of Physics (UK), 1994
- Centenary Medal, Australian Government, 2003
- Lars Onsager Prize, American Physical Society, 2006, "for his original and groundbreaking contributions to the field of exactly solved models in statistical mechanics, which continue to inspire profound developments in statistical physics and related fields"
- Royal Medal, 2013
- Henri Poincaré Prize, 2021

== Death and legacy ==
Baxter died in Canberra on 20 July 2025, at the age of 85.

The Rodney Baxter Prize for Mathematical Physics has been awarded since 2023 by the Australian Mathematical Society.

== Publications ==
- Baxter, Rodney J. (1982), Exactly solved models in statistical mechanics (PDF), London: Academic Press Inc. [Harcourt Brace Jovanovich Publishers], ISBN 978-0-12-083180-7, MR 0690578, Zbl 0538.60093
