= Chiral Potts model =

Spin model on a planar lattice

The chiral Potts model is a spin model on a planar lattice in statistical mechanics studied by Helen Au-Yang Perk and Jacques Perk, among others. It may be viewed as a generalization of the Potts model, and as with the Potts model, the model is defined by configurations which are assignments of spins to each vertex of a graph, where each spin can take one of $N$ values. To each edge joining vertices with assigned spins $n$ and $n'$, a Boltzmann weight $W(n,n')$ is assigned. For this model, chiral means that $W(n,n') \neq W(n',n)$. When the weights satisfy the Yang–Baxter equation, it is integrable, in the sense that certain quantities can be exactly evaluated.

For the integrable chiral Potts model, the weights are defined by a high genus curve, the chiral Potts curve. Unlike the other solvable models, whose weights are parametrized by curves of genus less or equal to one, so that they can be expressed in terms of trigonometric functions, rational functions for the genus zero case, or by theta functions for the genus 1 case, this model involves high genus theta functions, for which the theory is less well-developed.

The related chiral clock model, which was introduced in the 1980s by David Huse and Stellan Ostlund independently, is not exactly solvable, in contrast to the chiral Potts model.

== The model ==
This model is out of the class of all previously known models and raises a host of unsolved questions which are related to some of the most intractable problems of algebraic geometry which have been with us for 150 years. The chiral Potts models are used to understand the commensurate-incommensurate phase transitions. For N = 3 and 4, the integrable case was discovered in 1986 in Stony Brook and published the following year.

=== Self-dual case ===
The model is called self-dual if the Fourier transform of the weight function returns the same function. A special (genus 1) case had been solved in 1982 by Fateev and Zamolodchikov. By removing certain restrictions of the work of Alcaraz and Santos, a more general self-dual case of the integrable chiral Potts model was discovered. The weight are given in product form and the parameters in the weight are shown to be on the Fermat curve, with genus greater than 1.

=== General case ===
The general solution for all k (the temperature variable) was found. The weights were also given in product form and it was tested computationally (on Fortran) that they satisfy the star–triangle relation. The proof was published later.

== Results ==
=== Order parameter ===
From the series the order parameter was conjectured to have the simple form
$$\langle \sigma^n\rangle=(1-k'^2)^\beta,\quad \beta=n(N-n)/2N^2.$$
It took many years to prove this conjecture, as the usual corner transfer matrix technique could not be used, because of the higher genus curve. This conjecture was proven by Baxter in 2005 using functional equations and the "broken rapidity line" technique of Jimbo et al. assuming two mild analyticity conditions of the type commonly used in the field of Yang–Baxter integrable models. Most recently, in a series of papers an algebraic (Ising-like) way of obtaining the order parameter has been given, giving more insight into the algebraic structure.

=== Connection to six vertex model ===
In 1990 Bazhanov and Stroganov showed that there exist L-operators (Lax operator) which satisfy the Yang–Baxter equation

$$L_{i_1\alpha}^{j_1\beta}(x)L_{i_2\beta}^{j_2\gamma} (y)R_{j_1j_2}^{k_1k_2}(y/x)= R_{i_1i_2}^{j_1j_2} (y/x)L_{j_2\alpha}^{k_2\beta} (y)L_{j_1\beta}^{k_1\gamma}(x),\quad 0<i,j,k\le1,\quad 0\le \alpha, \beta,\gamma\le N-1.$$

where the 2 × 2 R-operator (R-matrix) is the six vertex model R-matrix (see Vertex model). The product of four chiral Potts weight S was shown to intertwine two L-operators as

$$L_{i_1\alpha_1}^{i_2\alpha_2} {\hat L}_{i_2\beta_1}^{i_3\beta_2} S_{\alpha_2\beta_2}^{\alpha_3\beta_3}= S_{\alpha_1\beta_1}^{\alpha_2\beta_2} {\hat L}_{i_1\beta_2}^{i_2\beta_3} L_{i_2\alpha_2}^{i_3\alpha_3},\quad 0<i_i\le1,\quad 0\le \alpha_i, \beta_i\le N-1.$$

This inspired a breakthrough, namely the functional relations for the transfer matrices of the chiral Potts models were discovered.

=== Free energy and interfacial tension ===
Using these functional relations, Baxter was able to calculate the eigenvalues of the transfer matrix of the chiral Potts model, and obtained the critical exponent for the specific heat α=1-2/N, which was also conjectured in reference 12. The interfacial tension was also calculated by him with the exponent μ=1/2+1/N.

== Relation with knot theory ==
The integrable chiral Potts weights are given in product form as

$$W_{pq}(n)\!=\!\Big({\mu_p\over\mu_q}\Big)^{\!\!n}\prod_{j=1}^n
{y_q-x_p\omega^j\over y_p-x_q\omega^j},\quad
\overline W_{pq}(n)\!=\!\big({\mu_p\mu_q}\big)^{\!n}\!\prod_{j=1}^n
{\omega x_p\!-\!x_q\omega^j\over y_q\!-\!y_p\omega^j},$$

where $\omega^N = 1$ is a primitive root of unity and we associate with each rapidity variable p three variables $(x_p, y_p, \mu_p)$ satisfying

$$x_p^N+y_p^N=k(1+x_p^N y_p^N),\quad
k'^2+k^2=1,\quad
k'\mu_p^N=1-k y_p^N,\quad
k'\mu_p^{-N}=1-k x_p^N.$$

It is easy to see that

$$W_{pp}(a-b)=1,\quad \overline W_{pp}(a-b)=\delta_{a,b}$$

which is similar to Reidemeister move I. It was also known that the weights satisfy the inversion relation,

$$W_{pq}(a-b)W_{qp}(a-b)=1,\quad
\sum_{d=0}^{N-1}\overline W_{pq}(a-d)\overline W_{qp}(d-a')=r_{pq}\delta_{a,a'}.$$

This is equivalent to Reidemeister move II. The star-triangle relation

$$\sum^{N}_{d=1}\,{\overline W}_{pr}(a-d)\,W_{pq}(d-c)\,{\overline  W}_{rq}(d-b)
=R_{pqr}\,\overline W_{pq}(a-b)\,{ W}_{pr}(b-c)\,W_{rq}(a-c)$$

is equivalent to Reidemeister move III. These are shown in the figures below.

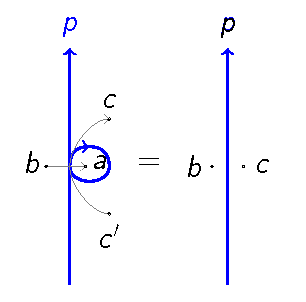
Property of the Weights: Reidemeister Move I

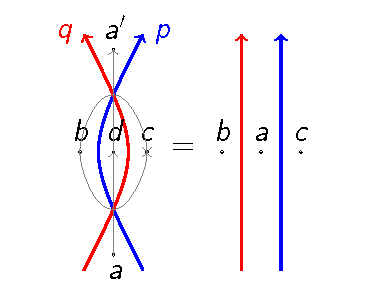
Inversion Relation of the Weights: Reidemeister Move II

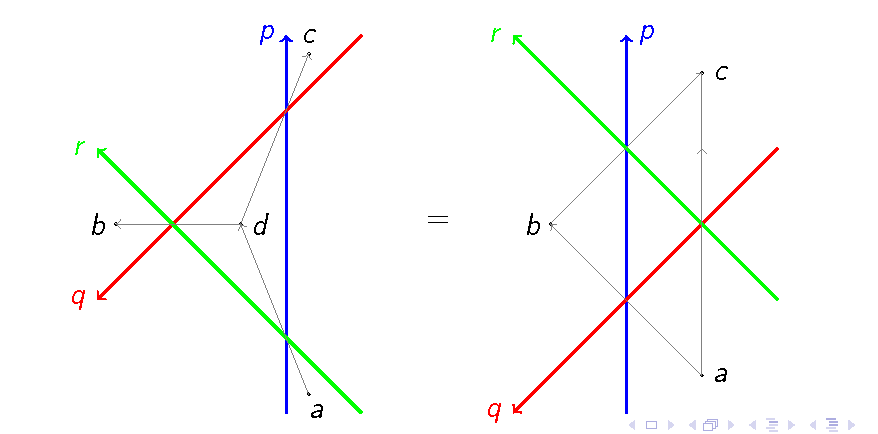
Star-triangle relation: Reidemeister Move III

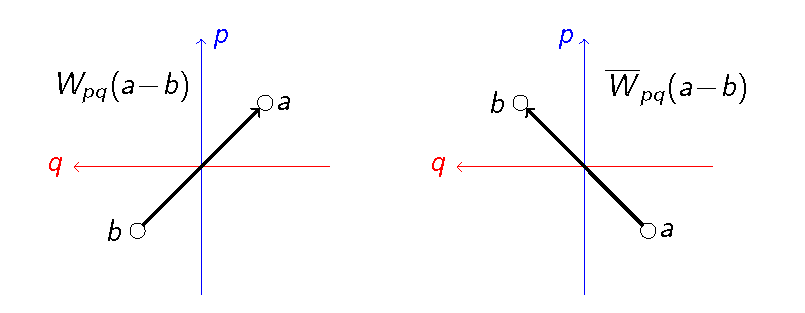
Weights of the Integrable chiral Potts models

== See also ==
- Z N model
