= Minority interpretations of quantum mechanics =

There is a diversity of views that propose interpretations of quantum mechanics. They vary in how many physicists accept or reject them. An interpretation of quantum mechanics is a conceptual scheme that proposes to relate the mathematical formalism to the physical phenomena of interest. The present article is about those interpretations which, independently of their intrinsic value, remain today less known, or are simply less debated by the scientific community, for different reasons.

== History ==
The historical dichotomy between the "orthodox" Copenhagen interpretation and "unorthodox" minority views developed in the 1950s debate surrounding Bohmian mechanics.

During most of the 20th century, collapse theories were clearly the mainstream view, and the question of interpretation of quantum mechanics mostly revolved around how to interpret "collapse". Proponents of either "pilot-wave" (de Broglie-Bohm-like) or "many-worlds" (Everettian) interpretations tend to emphasize how their respective camps were intellectually marginalized throughout 1950s to 1980s. In this (historical) sense, all non-collapse theories are (historically) "minority" interpretations.

The term 'Copenhagen interpretation' suggests some definite set of rules for interpreting the mathematical formalism of quantum mechanics. However, no such text exists, apart from some informal popular lectures by Bohr and Heisenberg, which contradict each other on several important issues. It appears that the term "Copenhagen interpretation", with its more definite sense, was coined by Heisenberg in the 1950s, while criticizing "unorthodox" interpretations such as that of David Bohm. Before the book was released for sale, Heisenberg privately expressed regret for having used the term, due to its suggestion of the existence of other interpretations, that he considered to be "nonsense".

Since the 1990s, there has been a resurgence of interest in non-collapse theories. Interpretations of quantum mechanics now mostly fall into the categories of collapse theories (including the Copenhagen interpretation), hidden variables ("Bohm-like"), many-worlds ("Everettian") and quantum information approaches. While collapse theories continue to be seen as the default or mainstream position, there is no longer any clear dichotomy between "orthodox" and "unorthodox" views. The Stanford Encyclopedia as of 2015 groups interpretations of quantum mechanics into five classes (all of which contain further divisions): "Bohmian mechanics" (pilot-wave theories), "collapse theories", "many-worlds interpretations", "modal interpretations" and "relational interpretations".

Some of the historically relevant approaches to quantum mechanics have now themselves become "minority interpretations", or widely seen as obsolete. In this sense, there is a variety of reasons for why a specific approach may be considered marginal: because it is a very specialized sub-variant of a more widely known class of interpretations, because it is seen as obsolete (in spite of possible historical significance), because it is a very recent suggestion that has not received wide attention, or because it is rejected as flawed.

As a rough guide to a picture of what are the relevant "minority" views, consider the "snapshot" of opinions collected in a poll by Schlosshauer et al. at the 2011 "Quantum Physics and the Nature of Reality" conference of July 2011. The authors reference a similarly informal poll carried out by Max Tegmark at the "Fundamental Problems in Quantum Theory" conference in August 1997. In both polls, the Copenhagen interpretation received the largest number of votes. In Tegmark's poll, many-worlds interpretations came in second place, while in the 2011 poll, many-worlds was at third place (18%), behind quantum information approaches in second place (24%). Other options given as "interpretation of quantum mechanics" in the 2011 poll were: objective collapse theories (9% support), quantum bayesianism (6% support) and relational quantum mechanics (6% support), besides consistent histories, de Broglie–Bohm theory, modal interpretation, ensemble interpretation and transactional interpretation which received no votes.

In 2026, a poll to about 1600 recipients of the American Physical Society indicated that 36% adhered to Copenhagen interpretation. The rest adhered to many-worlds interpretation (11%), Qbism (9%), pilot-wave (de Broglie–Bohm) (6%), collapse theories (7%), consistent histories (5%) and others (13%). The remaining 13% answered "no opinion".

== List of interpretations ==
=== Many-worlds ===
"Everettian" (many-worlds) interpretations as a whole were long a "minority" field in general, but they have grown in popularity. Multiple variants and offshoots of Everett's original proposal exist, which have sometimes developed the basic ideas in contradictory ways. Interpretations of an Everettian type include the following.

- Many-minds interpretation
- "Cosmological interpretations", such as that proposed by Anthony Aguirre and Max Tegmark, in which the wavefunction for a quantum system describes not an imaginary ensemble of possibilities for what the system might be doing, but rather the actual spatial collection of identical copies of the system that exist in the infinite space that is, hypothetically, generated by eternal inflation.
- "Self-locating uncertainty" interpretation
- Relative state interpretation

=== Quantum information ===
- QBism and other variants of Quantum Bayesianism
- Relational quantum mechanics treats the state of a quantum system as being observer-dependent, that is, the state is the relation between the observer and the system. While a relational conception of quantum states dates back at least to Grete Hermann in 1935, in modern usage "relational quantum mechanics" refers to an interpretation delineated by Carlo Rovelli in 1996. It uses some ideas from John Archibald Wheeler about quantum information.

=== Hidden variables ===
"Bohm-like" (hidden variable) theories as a whole are a "minority view" as compared to Copenhagen-type or many-worlds (Everettian) interpretations.

- Popper's propensity-based interpretation
- Stochastic interpretation, the most well-known variant of which was due to Edward Nelson, further elaborated upon by a conjecture of Francesco Calogero
- Time-symmetric interpretations
- Transactional interpretation
- Zitterbewegung interpretation
- Sutherland Interpretation
- Indivisible stochastic process interpretation

=== Collapse theories ===
- Consciousness causes collapse, mostly of historical interest
- Objective-collapse theories: these are extensions of quantum mechanics rather than "interpretations" in the narrow sense.
  - Penrose interpretation
  - Ghirardi-Rimini-Weber theory

=== Other ===
- The ensemble interpretation, or statistical interpretation can be viewed as a minimalist approach; The wave function in this interpretation is not a property of any individual system, it is by its nature a statistical description of a hypothetical "ensemble" of similar systems. This is the interpretation historically advocated by Albert Einstein.
- Modal interpretation (van Fraassen 1972) Van Fraassen's proposal is "modal" because it leads to a modal logic of quantum propositions. Since the 1980s, a number of authors have developed other "realist" proposals which can in retrospect be classed with van Fraassen's "modal" proposal.
- Superdeterminism (Bell 1977), the idea that the universe is completely deterministic, and thus Bell's theorem does not apply, as observers are not free to make independent choices in their measurements, rather everything is predetermined from the Big Bang.
- Consistent histories (Dowker and Kent 1995), based on a consistency criterion that then allows probabilities to be assigned to various alternative histories of a system.
- Montevideo interpretation (Gambini and Pullin 2009), suggesting that quantum gravity makes for fundamental limitations on the accuracy of clocks, which imply a type of decoherence.
- Pondicherry interpretation (Mohrhoff 2000–2005), based on the idea of objective probability and "supervenience of the microscopic on the macroscopic".
- Psychophysical interpretation(Pradhan 2012) based on Psychophysical parallelism takes the conjugate quantities to represent psychic counterparts to the corresponding physical aspects such as states and observables.
- The interpretation from a bundle-theoretic view of objective idealism (Korth 2022), based on the idea that quantum 'weirdness' follows from objects being bundles of universals.

== Quantum mysticism ==
Quantum mysticism is a set of metaphysical beliefs and associated practices that seek to relate consciousness, intelligence, spirituality, or mystical worldviews to the ideas of quantum mechanics and its interpretations. Quantum mysticism is considered by most scientists to be pseudoscience or quackery.
