= Mautner =

Mautner is a German surname. Notable people with the surname include:

- Amora Mautner (born 1975), International Emmy-nominated Brazilian television director and former actress
- Friederich Ignaz Mautner (1921–2001), Austrian-born American mathematician
- Jorge Mautner (born 1941) Brazilian singer-songwriter, violinist, actor, screenwriter
- Menachem Mautner, Professor of Comparative Civil Law and Jurisprudence at the Tel Aviv University
- Michael N. Mautner (born 1942), researcher in physical chemistry, astrobiology and astroecology
- Wilhelm Mautner (1889–1944), Austrian-German economist

== See also ==
- Jorge Mautner - O Filho do Holocausto, Brazilian documentary film
- Mautner's lemma, Unitary representation theory
- Mautner Project, national organization in the United States dedicated to improving the health of lesbians and other women who partner with women (WPW)
