= Calogero conjecture =

Minority interpretation of quantum mechanics

The Calogero conjecture is a minority interpretation of quantum mechanics. It is a quantization explanation involving quantum mechanics, originally stipulated in 1997 and further republished in 2004 by Francesco Calogero that suggests the classical stochastic background field to which Edward Nelson attributes quantum mechanical behavior in his theory of stochastic quantization is a fluctuating space-time, and that there are further mathematical relations between the involved quantities.

The hypothesis itself suggests that if the angular momentum associated with a stochastic tremor with spatial coherence provides an action purported by that motion within the order of magnitude of the Planck constant then the order of magnitude of the associated angular momentum has the same value. Calogero himself suggests that these findings, originally based on the simplified model of the universe "are affected (and essentially, unaffected) by the possible presence in the mass of the Universe of a large component made up of particles much lighter than nucleons".

Essentially, the relation explained by Calogero can be expressed with the formulas:

$$h \approx \alpha G^{1/2} m^{3/2} [R(t)]^{1/2}.$$

Furthermore:

$h \equiv h(t) = A \sqrt{R(t)} = h_0 \sqrt{a(t)}$ Const G,m

Where:

$G$ represents the gravitational constant
$m$ represents the mass of a hydrogen atom.
$R(t)$ represents the radius of the universe accessible by gravitational interactions in time, t.
$A$ is a dimensional constant.

Despite its common description, it has been noted that the conjecture is not entirely defined within the realms of Nelson's stochastic mechanics, but can also be thought of as a means of inquiring into the statistical effects of interaction with distant masses in the universe and was expected by Calogero himself to be within the same order of magnitude as quantum mechanical effects.

== Analysis ==
=== Compatibility with fundamental constants ===
After the publication of Calogero's original paper, "[The] [c]osmic origin of quantization" a response was published by Giuseppe Gaeta of the University of Rome in which he discussed the compatibility of the conjecture with present bounds on variation of fundamental constants, but also outlined his focus on the modification of the relation between redshift and distance, and of the estimations attained from observations of elapsed time from the production of cosmic radiation and implications—both being related also, to the observed blackbody distribution of background cosmic radiation.
