= Calogero–Moser–Sutherland model =

Model in classical and quantum mechanics

Calogero–Moser–Sutherland models (short CMS models) are a type of integrable one-dimensional many-body systems, which can be studied with exact results both from the classical and quantum perspective. Such models describe pointlike particles on a line or a circle with quadratic or inverse quadratic interactions between them. CMS models are named after Francesco Calogero, Jürgen Moser and Bill Sutherland. Calogero, in 1971, first considered the quantum model on a line with both a quadratic and inverse quadratic interaction. He computed the energy spectrum and described soliton scattering without the quadratic term. Sutherland, also in 1971, further considered the quantum model on the circle and modified the inverse quadratic interaction to include the sine. He also computed the energy spectrum and developed an algorithm to obtain the corresponding eigenfunctions. Moser, later in 1975, proved the integrability of both systems using Lax pairs and solved the scattering problem. A relativistic generalization of CMS models was later developed with Ruijsenaars–Schneider models (short RS models).

== Description ==
For $N$ particles on the real line $\mathbb{R}$, the Hamiltonian of the CMS model is given by:

$$H
=\frac{1}{2m}\sum_{i=1}^Np_i^2
+\frac{g^2}{m}\sum_{1\leq i<j\leq N}V(x_i-x_j).$$

Different potentials lead to different CMS models, which the four types most often considered being:

- Type I/rational:
  $$V(x)
=\frac{1}{x^2}.$$
- Type II/hyperbolic:
  $$V(x)
=\frac{a^2}{4\sinh(ax/2)^2}, a>0.$$
- Type III/trigonometric:
  $$V(x)
=\frac{a^2}{4\sin(ax/2)^2}.$$
- Type IV/elliptic:
  $$V(x)
=\weierp(x;\omega_1,\omega_2).$$

== Literature ==
- Calogero, Francesco (March 1971). "Solution of the One-Dimensional N-Body Problems with Quadratic and/or Inversely Quadratic Pair Potentials". Journal of Mathematical Physics. 12 (3): 195–456. Bibcode:1971JMP....12..419C. doi:10.1063/1.1665604.
- Sutherland, Bill (1971). "Exact Results for a Quantum Many-Body Problem in One Dimension". Physical Review A. 4 (5): 2019–2021. Bibcode:1971PhRvA...4.2019S. doi:10.1103/PhysRevA.4.2019.
- Moser, Jürgen (1975). "Three integrable Hamiltonian systems connected with isospectral deformation". Advances in Mathematics. 16 (2): 197–220. doi:10.1016/0001-8708(75)90151-6.
- Arutyunov, Gleb (2019-07-23). Elements of Classical and Quantum Integrable Systems. UNITEXT for Physics. Springer Nature. Bibcode:2019ecqi.book.....A. doi:10.1007/978-3-030-24198-8. ISBN 978-3-03024197-1.
- Hallnäs, Martin (2023-12-20). "Calogero-Moser-Sutherland systems". arXiv:2312.12932 [math-ph].
- van Diejen, Jan Felipe; Vinet, Luc, eds. (2000). Calogero—Moser—Sutherland Models. CRM Series in Mathematical Physics. New York, NY: Springer. doi:10.1007/978-1-4612-1206-5. ISBN 978-0-387-98968-6.
