= Calogero–Degasperis–Fokas equation =

In mathematics, the Calogero–Degasperis–Fokas equation is the nonlinear partial differential equation

$$\displaystyle u_t=u_{xxx}-\frac{1}{8}u_x^3 + u_x\left(Ae^u+Be^{-u}\right).$$

This equation was named after F. Calogero, A. Degasperis, and A. Fokas.

== See also ==
- Boomeron equation
- Zoomeron equation
