= Ruijsenaars–Schneider model =

Model in classical and quantum mechanics

Ruijsenaars–Schneider models (short RS models) are relativistic generalizations of Calogero–Moser–Sutherland models (short CMS models), which are closely connected with relativistic field theories like the Sine-Gordon model. RS models are named after Simon N. M. Ruijsenaars and Harald Schneider. Both of them introduced the classical models in 1986 and Ruijsenaars introduced the quantum models in 1987.

== Description ==
For $N$ particles on the real line $\mathbb{R}$, the Hamiltonian of the RS model is given by:

$$H
=mc^2\sum_{i=1}^N\cosh\left(\frac{p_i}{mc}\right)\prod_{\stackrel{1\leq j\leq N}{j\neq i}}f(x_i-x_j).$$

Different potentials lead to different RS models, which the four types most often considered being:

- Type I/rational:
  $$f(x)^2
=1+\left(\frac{g}{mcx}\right)^2.$$
- Type II/hyperbolic:
  $$f(x)^2
=1+\frac{\sin\left(\frac{ag}{mc}\right)^2}{\sinh(ax)^2}.$$
- Type III/trigonometric:
  $$f(x)^2
=1+\frac{\sinh\left(\frac{ag}{mc}\right)^2}{\sin(ax)^2}.$$
- Type IV/elliptic:
  $$f(x)^2
=a+b\weierp(x;\omega_1,\omega_2).$$

== Literature ==
- Ruijsenaars, Simon N. M.; Schneider, Herbert (September 1986). "A new class of integrable systems and its relation to solitons". Annals of Physics. 170 (2): 370–405. Bibcode:1986AnPhy.170..370R. doi:10.1016/0003-4916(86)90097-7.
- Ruijsenaars, Simon N. M. (June 1987). "Complete integrability of relativistic Calogero-Moser systems and elliptic function identities". Communications in Mathematical Physics. 110 (2): 191–213. Bibcode:1987CMaPh.110..191R. doi:10.1007/BF01207363.
- Arutyunov, Gleb (2019-07-23). Elements of Classical and Quantum Integrable Systems. UNITEXT for Physics. Springer Nature. Bibcode:2019ecqi.book.....A. doi:10.1007/978-3-030-24198-8. ISBN 978-3-03024197-1.
- Hallnäs, Martin (2023-12-20). "Calogero-Moser-Sutherland systems". arXiv:2312.12932 [math-ph].
- van Diejen, Jan Felipe; Vinet, Luc, eds. (2000). Calogero—Moser—Sutherland Models. CRM Series in Mathematical Physics. New York, NY: Springer. doi:10.1007/978-1-4612-1206-5. ISBN 978-0-387-98968-6.
