= Chiral Potts curve =

The chiral Potts curve is an algebraic curve defined over the complex numbers that occurs in the study of the chiral Potts model of statistical mechanics. For an integer N, the parameters in the Boltzmann weights of the model are constrained to lie on the intersection of two algebraic surfaces of degree N in projective 3-space.

The equation is $x^N+y^N=k(1+x^N y^N)$.

The curve has been known since papers published in 1987 and 1988. It has genus that is quadratic in N.
