= Athanassios Fokas =

Greek mathematician (born 1952)

- Born: Athanassios Spyridon Fokas; 30 June 1952 (age 74); Cefalonia, Greece
- Education: Imperial College (B.S., 1975); Caltech (Ph.D., 1979); University of Miami School of Medicine (M.D., 1986)
- Known for: Fokas method Calogero–Degasperis–Fokas equation Fokas–Lenells equation
- Awards: Naylor Prize; Aristeion Prize in Sciences of the Academy of Athens (2004); New Year's list of honours (2005) of the President of the Hellenic Republic; Commander of the Order of the Phoenix (2005); Professorial Fellow of Clare Hall (2005); Aristeion Prize of the Bodossaki Foundation jointly with D. Christodoulou (2006); Guggenheim Fellowship (2009); Fellow of the European Academy of Sciences (2010); Honorary Doctorate of Sciences – Technical University of Crete (2004); Honorary Doctorate of Mathematics – University of Patras (2004); Honorary Doctorate of Applied Mathematics and Physical Sciences – Technical University of Athens (2005); Honorary Doctorate in Mathematics – University of Athens (2006); Honorary Doctorate of Computer Engineering and Telecommunications – University of Western Macedonia (2007); Honorary Doctorate in Material Science – University of Ioannina (2012); Honorary Doctorate in Electrical and Computer Engineering – Democritus University (2018)
- Scientific career
- Fields: Mathematics; Engineering; Medicine
- Workplaces: Clarkson University; Imperial College London; University of Cambridge; University of Southern California
- Doctoral advisor: Paco Axel Lagerstrom

Athanassios Spyridon Fokas (Greek: Αθανάσιος Σπυρίδων Φωκάς; born 30 June 1952) is a United Kingdom–based Greek academic, educator and scientist, with degrees in Aeronautical Engineering and Medicine. Since 2002, he is Professor of Nonlinear Mathematical Science in the Department of Applied Mathematics and Theoretical Physics (DAMTP) at the University of Cambridge.

== Education ==
Fokas earned a BS in Aeronautics from Imperial College in 1975 and a PhD in Applied mathematics from Caltech in 1979. His dissertation, Invariants, Lie-Backlund Operators and Backlund Transformations, was written under the direction of Paco Axel Lagerstrom. He subsequently attended the Miller School of Medicine at the University of Miami, earning his medical degree in 1986.

== Career ==
After medical school, Fokas was appointed Professor and Chair of the Department of Mathematics and Computer Science at Clarkson University in 1986. From there, he moved to Imperial College in 1996 to a Chair of Applied Mathematics. Since 2002, he holds the Professorship of Nonlinear Mathematical Science (2000) in the Department of Applied Mathematics and Theoretical Physics at the University of Cambridge, a professorship established in the year 2000 for a single tenure. He was elected a Member of the Academy of Athens in 2004 and a professorial fellow of Clare Hall, Cambridge in 2005.

=== Research contributions ===
Fokas has written about symmetries, integrable nonlinear PDEs, Painlevé equations and random matrices, models for leukemia and protein folding, electro-magneto-enchephalography, nuclear imaging, and relativistic gravity. Also, he has introduced a new method for solving boundary value problems known as the Fokas method.

I. M. Gelfand, a mathematician, who has also written about biology, in the citation for the Aristeion prize, wrote ''Fokas is now a very rare example of a scientist in the style of the Renaissance".

== Awards ==
Fokas received the Naylor Prize from the London Mathematical Society in 2000. He was awarded a Guggenheim Fellowship (2009). He was awarded a Blaise Pascal Medal and elected to the Mathematics section of Academia Europaea in 2023. He was elected as a Fellow of the American Mathematical Society in the 2024 class of fellows.

== Personal life ==
Fokas is married to Regina Karousou-Fokas with whom he has two children, Anastasia and Ioanna.

== Books ==
- M J Ablowitz and A S Fokas, Complex Variables: Introduction and Applications, Cambridge University Press, second edition (2003)
- A S Fokas, A R Its, A A Kapaev and V Yu Novokshenov, Painlevé Transcendents: A Riemann-Hilbert Approach, AMS (2006)
- A S Fokas, A Unified Approach to Boundary Value Problems , CBMS-SIAM (2008)
- A S Fokas and B. Pelloni, eds, Unified Transform for Boundary Value Problems: Applications and advances, SIAM (2015).

== See also ==
- Calogero–Degasperis–Fokas equation
- Fokas method
