= Leon Ehrenpreis =

American mathematician (1930-2010)

Eliezer 'Leon' Ehrenpreis (May 22, 1930 – August 16, 2010, Brooklyn) was a mathematician at Temple University who proved the Malgrange–Ehrenpreis theorem, the fundamental theorem about differential operators with constant coefficients. He previously held tenured positions at Yeshiva University and at the Courant Institute at New York University.

== Early life and education ==
Leon was born in New York City to a family of Jewish immigrants from Eastern Europe. He graduated from Stuyvesant High School and studied Mathematics as an undergraduate at City College of New York. Afterward, he enrolled as a doctoral student at Columbia University where he studied under mathematician Claude Chevalley, obtaining his PhD in 1953 at the age of 23. His doctoral thesis was entitled "Theory of Distributions in Locally Compact Spaces".

== Religion ==
Ehrenpreis was also a Rabbi, having received his ordination from the renowned Rabbi Moshe Feinstein. He was the author of a work on the Chumash and other religious topics, currently in manuscript.

== Miscellaneous ==
Ehrenpreis ran the New York City Marathon every year from its inception until 2007.

== Publications ==
- Ehrenpreis, Leon (1954), "Solution of some problems of division. I. Division by a polynomial of derivation", Amer. J. Math., 76 (4): 883–903, doi:10.2307/2372662, JSTOR 2372662, MR 0068123
- —— (1955), "Solution of some problems of division. II. Division by a punctual distribution", Amer. J. Math., 77 (2): 286–292, doi:10.2307/2372532, JSTOR 2372532, MR 0070048
- Ehrenpreis, Leon; Mautner, F. I. (April 15, 1955). "Uniformly Bounded Representations of Groups". Proc Natl Acad Sci U S A. 41 (4): 231–233. Bibcode:1955PNAS...41..231E. doi:10.1073/pnas.41.4.231. PMC 528064. PMID 16589653.
- Ehrenpreis, Leon (October 15, 1955). "The Division Problem for Distributions". Proc Natl Acad Sci U S A. 41 (10): 756–758. Bibcode:1955PNAS...41..756E. doi:10.1073/pnas.41.10.756. PMC 528179. PMID 16589744.
- —— (November 15, 1955). "Completely Inversible Operators". Proc Natl Acad Sci U S A. 41 (11): 945–946. Bibcode:1955PNAS...41..945E. doi:10.1073/pnas.41.11.945. PMC 534310. PMID 16589777.
- —— (January 1956). "General Theory of Elliptic Equations". Proc Natl Acad Sci U S A. 42 (1): 39–41. Bibcode:1956PNAS...42...39E. doi:10.1073/pnas.42.1.39. PMC 534228. PMID 16589811.
- —— (September 1956). "Cauchy's Problem for Linear Differential Equations with Constant Coefficients". Proc Natl Acad Sci U S A. 42 (9): 642–646. Bibcode:1956PNAS...42..642E. doi:10.1073/pnas.42.9.642. PMC 534268. PMID 16589923.
- —— (1956). "Sheaves and differential equations". Proc. Amer. Math. Soc. 7: 1131–1138. doi:10.1090/s0002-9939-1956-0085419-7. MR 0085419.
- —— (1956). "On the theory of kernels of Schwartz". Proc. Amer. Math. Soc. 7 (4): 713–718. doi:10.1090/s0002-9939-1956-0082637-9. MR 0082637.
- —— (1958). "Analytic functions and the Fourier transform of distributions, II". Trans. Amer. Math. Soc. 89 (2): 450–483. doi:10.1090/s0002-9947-1958-0105616-8. MR 0105616.
- —— (1961). "Analytically uniform spaces and some applications". Trans. Amer. Math. Soc. 101: 52–74. doi:10.1090/s0002-9947-1961-0131756-3. MR 0131756.
- —— (1961). "A new proof and an extension of Hartog's theorem". Bull. Amer. Math. Soc. 67 (5): 507–509. doi:10.1090/s0002-9904-1961-10661-7. MR 0131663.
- Bers, Lipman; Ehrenpreis, Leon (1964). "Holomorphic convexity of Teichmüller spaces". Bull. Amer. Math. Soc. 70 (6): 761–764. doi:10.1090/s0002-9904-1964-11230-1. MR 0168800.
- Ehrenpreis, Leon (1975). "Hyperbolic equations and group representations". Bull. Amer. Math. Soc. 81 (6): 1109–111. doi:10.1090/s0002-9904-1975-13936-x. MR 0419685.
- —— (1987). "Reflections, removable singularities, and approximations for partial differential equations, II". Trans. Amer. Math. Soc. 302: 1–45. doi:10.1090/s0002-9947-1987-0887494-0. MR 0887494.

== See also ==
- Ehrenpreis's fundamental principle
- Ehrenpreis conjecture
