= T. Bill Sutherland =

American physicist

Bill Sutherland
- Born: March 31, 1942 (age 84); Missouri
- Education: Washington University in St. Louis; Stony Brook
- Known for: Six and eight vertex model
- Awards: Dannie Heineman Prize for Mathematical Physics (2019)
- Scientific career
- Fields: Quantum many-body theory and statistical mechanics
- Workplaces: University of Utah
- Doctoral advisor: Yang Chen-Ning

T. Bill Sutherland (born March 31, 1942) is an American theoretical physicist, Emeritus Professor of Physics at the University of Utah.

He received his BA from Washington University in St. Louis and his PhD in 1968 while studying under Nobel laureate C. N. Yang at Stony Brook. He is best known for his work in statistical mechanics and quantum many body theory. Early in his career he solved the six vertex model and developed an exact solution in 1967, which he then followed with the eight vertex model in 1970. He completed his postdoctoral work at University of California, Berkeley in the 1969-1971 time frame where he became interested in inverse square potential many body interactions. He then became a professor of physics at the University of Utah in 1971 where he worked until his retirement in 2004.

Most notably his name is associated with the Calogero–Moser–Sutherland model, which is a major research area in theoretical physics and mathematics.

He was elected a Fellow of the American Physical Society in 1989 " for contributions to the understanding of electronic states in solids" For his profound contributions to the field of exactly solvable models in statistical mechanics and many-body physics, Sutherland was a co-recipient of the society's 2019 Dannie Heineman Prize for Mathematical Physics, alongside Francesco Calogero and Michel Gaudin.

== Selected works ==
- Sutherland, Bill (2004). Beautiful Models. World Scientific. ISBN 978-981-238-859-9.
