= Friederich Ignaz Mautner =

Austrian-American mathematician (1921-2002)

Friederich I. Mautner
- Born: May 14, 1921; Vienna, First Austrian Republic
- Died: 1996
- Education: Princeton University
- Scientific career
- Fields: Mathematics
- Workplaces: Johns Hopkins University
- Doctoral advisor: John von Neumann
- Doctoral students: Joseph Shalika

Friederich Ignaz Mautner (14 May 1921–2002) was an Austrian-American mathematician, known for his research on the representation theory of groups, functional analysis, and differential geometry. He is known for Mautner's Lemma and Mautner's Phenomenon in the representation theory of Lie groups.

== Life and career ==
Following the Anschluss in 1938, Mautner, a Jew, emigrated from Austria to the UK where he became one of the thousands or refugees who were interred by the British and shipped off to Hay Camp 7 in Australia. While there he was fortunate in that he got to study mathematics under Felix Behrend. When he got back to the UK, he garnered a BSc at Durham University and then went to Ireland in 1944 where he got an assistantship with Paul Ewald at Queens University Belfast (QUB). He then became a scholar at the Dublin Institute for Advanced Studies in 1944–1946.

He then moved to the USA, where he was a visiting scholar at the Institute for Advanced Study (IAS) in Princeton (1946-47).

He then attended Princeton University and got a Ph.D. in 1948 with the thesis Unitary Representations of Infinite Groups.

He was a Guggenheim Fellow at Johns Hopkins University in the academic year 1954-55.

Working in the fields of ergodic theory of geodesic flows, he published a paper in 1957 that established the lemma and the phenomenon that bear his name.

He published a ground-breaking paper in 1958 that established him as a pioneer in the representation theory of reducible p-adic groups.

The Mautner Group, a special five-dimensional Lie group, is named after him.

Frederich had one daughter, Jean Mautner.

== Selected works ==
- Mautner, F. I. (February 1948). "The Completeness of the Irreducible Unitary Representations of a Locally Compact Group". Proc Natl Acad Sci U S A. 34 (2): 52–54. doi:10.1073/pnas.34.2.52. PMC 1062914. PMID 16588786.
- Mautner, F. I. (1950). "Unitary representations of locally compact groups I". Annals of Mathematics. Second Series. 51 (1): 1–24. doi:10.2307/1969494. JSTOR 1969494.
- Mautner, F. I. (1950). "Unitary representations of locally compact groups II". Annals of Mathematics. Second Series. 52 (3): 528–556. doi:10.2307/1969431. JSTOR 1969431.
- Mautner, F. I. (1950). "Infinite-dimensional irreducible representations of certain groups". Proc. Amer. Math. Soc. 1 (5): 582–584. doi:10.1090/s0002-9939-1950-0039728-2. MR 0039728.
- Mautner, F. I. (1951). "The regular representation of a restricted product of finite groups". Trans. Amer. Math. Soc. 70 (3): 531–548. doi:10.1090/s0002-9947-1951-0041855-6. MR 0041855.
- Mautner, F. I. (1951). "On the decomposition of unitary representations of Lie groups". Proc. Amer. Math. Soc. 2 (3): 490–496. doi:10.1090/s0002-9939-1951-0041856-3. MR 0041856.
- Mautner, F. I. (July 1951). "A Generalization of the Frobenius Reciprocity Theorem". Proc Natl Acad Sci U S A. 37 (7): 431–435. doi:10.1073/pnas.37.7.431. PMC 1063394. PMID 16578378.
- Mautner, F. I. (August 1951). "Fourier Analysis and Symmetric Spaces". Proc Natl Acad Sci U S A. 37 (8): 529–533. doi:10.1073/pnas.37.8.529. PMC 1063414. PMID 16578390.
- Mautner, F. I. (January 1953). "On Eigenfunction Expansions". Proc Natl Acad Sci U S A. 39 (1): 49–53. doi:10.1073/pnas.39.1.49. PMC 1063724. PMID 16589235.
- Mautner, F. I. (January 1954). "Geodesic Flows and Unitary Representations". Proc Natl Acad Sci U S A. 40 (1): 33–36. doi:10.1073/pnas.40.1.33. PMC 527933. PMID 16589421.
- with L. Ehrenpreis: Ehrenpreis, L.; Mautner, F. I. (15 April 1955). "Uniformly bounded representations of groups". Proc Natl Acad Sci U S A. 41 (4): 231–233. doi:10.1073/pnas.41.4.231. PMC 528064. PMID 16589653.
- Mautner, F. I. (1955). "Note on the Fourier inversion formula on groups". Trans. Amer. Math. Soc. 78 (2): 371–384. doi:10.1090/s0002-9947-1955-0067230-x. MR 0067230.
- with L. Ehrenpreis: Ehrenpreis, L.; Mautner, F. I. (1957). "Some properties of the Fourier transform on semi-simple Lie groups. II". Trans. Amer. Math. Soc. 84: 1–55. doi:10.1090/s0002-9947-1957-0083683-7. MR 0083683.
- with L. Ehrenpreis: Ehrenpreis, L.; Mautner, F. I. (1957). "Some properties of the Fourier transform on semi-simple Lie groups. III". Trans. Amer. Math. Soc. 90 (3): 431–484. doi:10.1090/s0002-9947-1959-0102755-3. MR 0102755.
