= Francesco Calogero =

Italian physicist and peace activist (1935–2026)

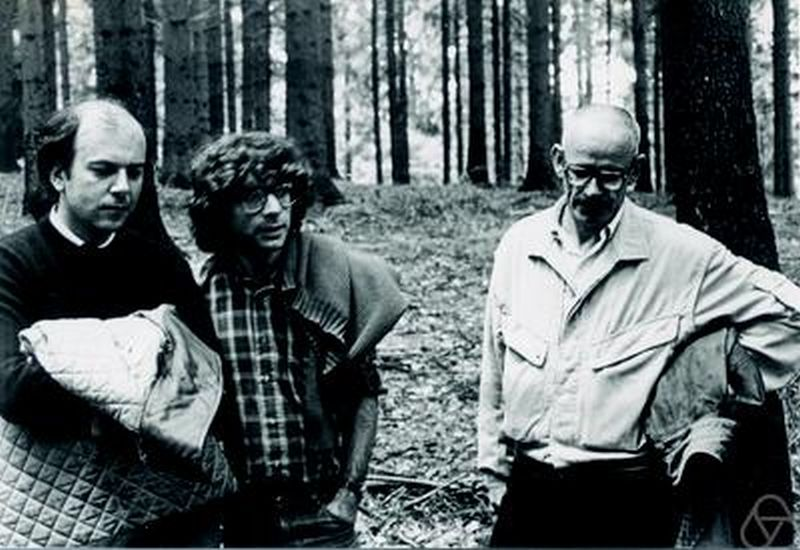
Calogero (right) in 1984, with Corrado de Concini and Eugene Trubowitz

Francesco Calogero (6 February 1935 – 30 January 2026) was an Italian physicist, active in the community of scientists concerned with nuclear disarmament.

== Background ==
Born in Fiesole on 6 February 1935, he was the son of the philosopher Guido Calogero. After his father was sentenced to national exile by fascist police, Francesco Calogero spent more than one year (1942) in Scanno, a small Italian village. After World War II, Calogero graduated "laurea in fisica" cum laude at University of Rome La Sapienza, in February 1958. He became Professor of Theoretical Physics at the same university in 1976.

Calogero died in Rome on 30 January 2026, at the age of 90.

== Physics research ==
Calogero's scientific publications in English include five books and over 400 papers (about half with co-authors). His main research concerned integrable many-body problems. Several solvable many-body models and nonlinear evolution partial differential equations (PDEs) are named after Calogero in the mathematical physics literature, for example the Calogero–Moser–Sutherland model. He also formulated the Calogero conjecture that quantum behavior is caused by the stochastic component of the local gravitational field due to the chaotic component of the motion of all particles of the Universe due to their mutual gravitational interaction. He also introduced a novel differential algorithm to evaluate all the zeros of any generic polynomial of arbitrary degree [F. Calogero, "Novel differential algorithm to evaluate all the zeros of any generic polynomial", J. Nonlinear Math. Phys. 24, 469-472 (2017). DOI: 10.1080/14029251.2017.1375685].

For his profound contributions to the field of exactly solvable models in statistical mechanics and many-body physics, Calogero was a co-recipient of the American Physical Society's 2019 Dannie Heineman Prize for Mathematical Physics, alongside T. Bill Sutherland and Michel Gaudin. In 2019 he accepted from the President of the Italian Republic Sergio Mattarella the "Prize of the President of the Italian Republic", awarded in alternate years to a scientist and a humanist by the Accademia Nazionale dei Lincei, the main Italian Academy.

== Peace activism ==
Calogero served as Secretary-General of Pugwash Conferences on Science and World Affairs from 1989 to 1997, and from 1997 to 2002 as chair of the Pugwash Council, of which he still was an "ex-officio" member. He published (in Italian and English---some with co-authors) nearly 400 papers and several books on world affairs.

He was a member of the Governing Board of the Stockholm International Peace Research Institute from 1982 to 1992.

Calogero accepted on behalf of Pugwash the 1995 Nobel Peace Prize, jointly awarded to Pugwash and to Joseph Rotblat (Oslo, 10 December 1995).

== See also ==
- Calogero–Degasperis–Fokas equation
