= Eight-vertex model =

Generalization of the ice-type (six-vertex) models

In statistical mechanics, the eight-vertex model is a generalization of the ice-type (six-vertex) models. It was discussed by T. Bill Sutherland and C. Fan & F. Y. Wu, and solved by Rodney Baxter in the zero-field case.

== Description ==
As with the ice-type models, the eight-vertex model is a square lattice model, where each state is a configuration of arrows at a vertex. The allowed vertices have an even number of arrows pointing towards the vertex; these include the six inherited from the ice-type model (1-6), sinks (7), and sources (8).

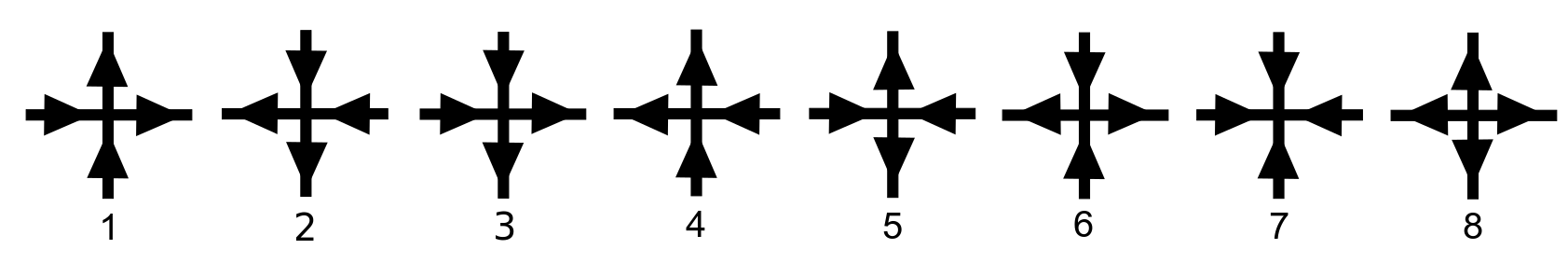
The eight allowed vertices.

We consider a $N\times N$ lattice, with $N^2$ vertices and $2N^2$ edges. Imposing periodic boundary conditions requires that the states 7 and 8 occur equally often, as do states 5 and 6, and thus can be taken to have the same energy. For the zero-field case the same is true for the two other pairs of states. Each vertex $j$ has an associated energy $\epsilon_j$ and Boltzmann weight

$$w_j=\exp\left(-\frac{\epsilon_j}{k_\mathrm{B}T}\right)$$

giving the partition function over the lattice as

$$Z=\sum \exp\left(-\frac{\sum_j n_j\epsilon_j}{k_\mathrm{B}T}\right)$$

where the outer summation is over all allowed configurations of vertices in the lattice. In this general form the partition function remains unsolved.

== Solution in the zero-field case ==
The zero-field case of the model corresponds physically to the absence of external electric fields. Hence, the model remains unchanged under the reversal of all arrows. The states 1 and 2, and 3 and 4, consequently must occur as pairs. The vertices may be assigned arbitrary weights

$$\begin{align}
w_1=w_2&=a\\
w_3=w_4&=b\\
w_5=w_6&=c\\
w_7=w_8&=d.
\end{align}$$

The solution is based on the observation that rows in transfer matrices commute, for a certain parametrization of these four Boltzmann weights. This came about as a modification of an alternate solution for the six-vertex model which makes use of elliptic theta functions.

=== Commuting transfer matrices ===
The proof relies on the fact that when $\Delta'=\Delta$ and $\Gamma'=\Gamma$, for quantities

$$\begin{align}
\Delta&=\frac{a^2+b^2-c^2-d^2}{2(ab+cd)}\\
\Gamma&=\frac{ab-cd}{ab+cd}
\end{align}$$

the transfer matrices $T$ and $T'$ (associated with the weights $a$, $b$, $c$, $d$ and $a'$, $b'$, $c'$, $d'$) commute. Using the star-triangle relation, Baxter reformulated this condition as equivalent to a parametrization of the weights given as

$$a:b:c:d=\operatorname{snh}(\eta-u):\operatorname{snh} (\eta +u):\operatorname{snh} (2\eta): k\operatorname{snh} (2\eta)\operatorname{snh} (\eta-u)\operatorname{snh} (\eta+u)$$

for fixed modulus $k$ and $\eta$ and variable $u$. Here snh is the hyperbolic analogue of sn, given by

$$\begin{align}
\operatorname {snh} (u) &=-i\operatorname {sn} (iu) = i\operatorname {sn} (-iu) \\
\text{where } \operatorname {sn} (u)&= \frac{H(u)}{\sqrt{k} \Theta(u)}
\end{align}$$

and $H(u)$ and $\Theta(u)$ are theta functions of modulus $k$. The associated transfer matrix $T$ thus is a function of $u$ alone; for all $u$, $v$

$$T(u)T(v)=T(v)T(u).$$

=== The matrix function $Q(u)$ ===
The other crucial part of the solution is the existence of a nonsingular matrix-valued function $Q$, such that for all complex $u$ the matrices $Q(u), Q(u')$ commute with each other and the transfer matrices, and satisfy

$\zeta(u)T(u)Q(u)=\phi(u-\eta)Q(u+2\eta)+\phi(u+\eta)Q(u-2\eta)$	1

where

$$\begin{align}
\zeta(u)&=[c^{-1}H(2\eta)\Theta(u-\eta)\Theta(u+\eta)]^N\\
\phi(u)&=[\Theta(0)H(u)\Theta(u)]^N.
\end{align}$$

The existence and commutation relations of such a function are demonstrated by considering pair propagations through a vertex, and periodicity relations of the theta functions, in a similar way to the six-vertex model.

=== Explicit solution ===
The commutation of matrices in (1) allow them to be diagonalised, and thus eigenvalues can be found. The partition function is calculated from the maximal eigenvalue, resulting in a free energy per site of

$$\begin{align}
f=\epsilon_5-2kT\sum_{n=1}^\infty \frac{\sinh^2((\tau-\lambda)n)(\cosh(n\lambda)-\cosh(n\alpha))}{n\sinh(2n\tau)\cosh(n\lambda)}
\end{align}$$

for

$$\begin{align}
\tau&=\frac{\pi K'}{2K}\\
\lambda&=\frac{\pi \eta}{iK}\\
\alpha&=\frac{\pi u}{iK}
\end{align}$$

where $K$ and $K'$ are the complete elliptic integrals of moduli $k$ and $k'$. The eight vertex model was also solved in quasicrystals.

== Equivalence with an Ising model ==
There is a natural correspondence between the eight-vertex model, and the Ising model with 2-spin and 4-spin nearest neighbor interactions. The states of this model are spins $\sigma=\pm 1$ on faces of a square lattice. The analogue of 'edges' in the eight-vertex model are products of spins on adjacent faces:

$$\begin{align}
\alpha_{ij}&=\sigma_{ij}\sigma_{i,j+1}\\
\mu_{ij}&=\sigma_{ij}\sigma_{i+1,j}.
\end{align}$$

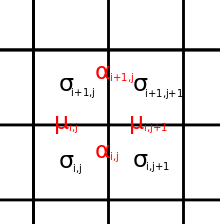

The most general form of the energy for this model is

$$\begin{align}
\epsilon&=-\sum_{ij}(J_h\mu_{ij}+J_v\alpha_{ij}+J\alpha_{ij}\mu_{ij}+J'\alpha_{i+1,j}\mu_{ij}+J''\alpha_{ij}\alpha_{i+1,j})
\end{align}$$

where $J_h$, $J_v$, $J$, $J'$ describe the horizontal, vertical and two diagonal 2-spin interactions, and $J''$ describes the 4-spin interaction between four faces at a vertex; the sum is over the whole lattice.

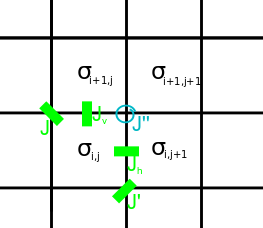

We denote horizontal and vertical spins (arrows on edges) in the eight-vertex model $\mu$, $\alpha$ respectively, and define up and right as positive directions. The restriction on vertex states is that the product of four edges at a vertex is 1; this automatically holds for Ising "edges." Each $\sigma$ configuration then corresponds to a unique $\mu$, $\alpha$ configuration, whereas each $\mu$, $\alpha$ configuration gives two choices of $\sigma$ configurations.

Equating general forms of Boltzmann weights for each vertex $j$, the following relations between the $\epsilon_j$ and $J_h$, $J_v$, $J$, $J'$, $J''$ define the correspondence between the lattice models:

$$\begin{align}
\epsilon_1&=-J_h-J_v-J-J'-J'',\quad \epsilon_2=J_h+J_v-J-J'-J''\\
\epsilon_3&=-J_h+J_v+J+J'-J'',\quad \epsilon_4=J_h-J_v+J+J'-J''\\
\epsilon_5&=\epsilon_6=J-J'+J''\\
\epsilon_7&=\epsilon_8=-J+J'+J''.
\end{align}$$

It follows that in the zero-field case of the eight-vertex model, the horizontal and vertical interactions in the corresponding Ising model vanish.

These relations gives the equivalence $Z_I=2Z_{8V}$ between the partition functions of the eight-vertex model, and the (2,4)-spin Ising model. Consequently a solution in either model would lead immediately to a solution in the other.

== See also ==
- Six-vertex model
- Transfer-matrix method
- Ising model
