= Quantum weirdness =

Unintuitive aspects of quantum mechanics

Quantum weirdness encompasses the aspects of quantum mechanics that challenge and defy human physical intuition.

Human physical intuition is based on macroscopic physical phenomena as are experienced in everyday life, which can mostly be adequately described by the Newtonian mechanics of classical physics. Early 20th-century models of atomic physics, such as the Rutherford–Bohr model, represented subatomic particles as little balls occupying well-defined spatial positions, but it was soon found that the physics needed at a subatomic scale, which became known as "quantum mechanics", implies many aspects for which the models of classical physics are inadequate. These aspects include:

- quantum entanglement;
- quantum nonlocality, referred to by Einstein as "spooky action at a distance"; see also EPR paradox;
- quantum superposition, presented in dramatic form in the thought experiment known as Schrödinger's cat;
- the uncertainty principle;
- wave–particle duality;
- the probabilistic nature of wave function collapse, decried by Einstein, saying, "God does not play dice".

== See also ==
- Bell's theorem
- Interpretations of quantum mechanics
- Quantum tunneling
- Renninger negative-result experiment
- Wheeler's delayed-choice experiment
