= Mautner's lemma =

Result in representation theory

Mautner's lemma in representation theory, named after Austrian-American mathematician Friederich Mautner, states that if G is a topological group and π a unitary representation of G on a Hilbert space H, then for any x in G, which has conjugates

yxy^{−1}

converging to the identity element e, for a net of elements y, then any vector v of H invariant under all the π(y) is also invariant under π(x).
