= Ice-type model =

Statistical mechanics model for crystal lattices

In statistical mechanics, the ice-type models or six-vertex models are a family of vertex models for crystal lattices with hydrogen bonds. The first such model was introduced by Linus Pauling in 1935 to account for the residual entropy of water ice. Variants have been proposed as models of certain ferroelectric and antiferroelectric crystals.

In 1967, Elliott H. Lieb found the exact solution to a two-dimensional ice model known as "square ice". The exact solution in three dimensions is only known for a special "frozen" state.

== Description ==
An ice-type model is a lattice model defined on a lattice of coordination number 4. That is, each vertex of the lattice is connected by an edge to four "nearest neighbours". A state of the model consists of an arrow on each edge of the lattice, such that the number of arrows pointing inwards at each vertex is 2. This restriction on the arrow configurations is known as the ice rule. In graph theoretic terms, the states are Eulerian orientations of an underlying 4-regular undirected graph. The partition function also counts the number of nowhere-zero 3-flows.

For two-dimensional models, the lattice is taken to be the square lattice. For more realistic models, one can use a three-dimensional lattice appropriate to the material being considered; for example, the hexagonal ice lattice is used to analyse ice.

At any vertex, there are six configurations of the arrows which satisfy the ice rule (justifying the name "six-vertex model"). The valid configurations for the (two-dimensional) square lattice are the following:

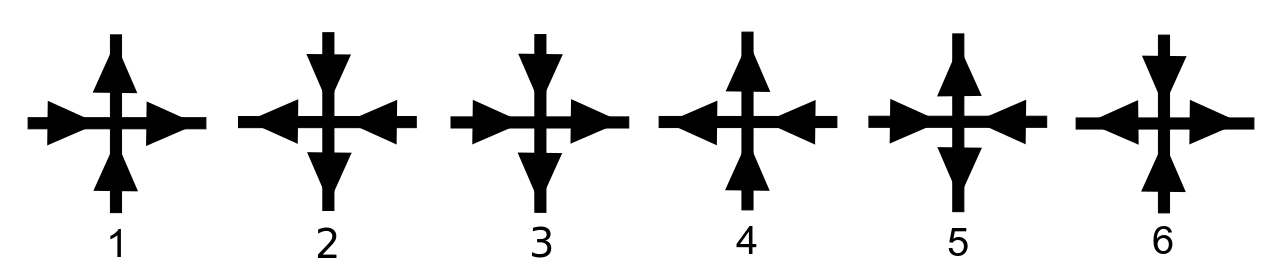

The energy of a state is understood to be a function of the configurations at each vertex. For square lattices, one assumes that the total energy $E$ is given by

$$E = n_1\epsilon_1 + n_2\epsilon_2 + \ldots + n_6\epsilon_6,$$

for some constants $\epsilon_1,\ldots,\epsilon_6$, where $n_i$ here denotes the number of vertices with the $i$th configuration from the above figure. The value $\epsilon_i$ is the energy associated with vertex configuration number $i$.

One aims to calculate the partition function $Z$ of an ice-type model, which is given by the formula

$$Z = \sum \exp(-E/k_{\rm B}T),$$

where the sum is taken over all states of the model, $E$ is the energy of the state, $k_{\rm B}$ is the Boltzmann constant, and $T$ is the system's temperature.

Typically, one is interested in the thermodynamic limit in which the number $N$ of vertices approaches infinity. In that case, one instead evaluates the free energy per vertex $f$ in the limit as $N\to \infty$, where $f$ is given by

$$f = -k_{\rm B}T N^{-1}\log Z.$$

Equivalently, one evaluates the partition function per vertex $W$ in the thermodynamic limit, where

$$W=Z^{1/N}.$$

The values $f$ and $W$ are related by

$$f= -k_{\rm B}T \log W.$$

== Physical justification ==
Several real crystals with hydrogen bonds satisfy the ice model, including ice and potassium dihydrogen phosphate KH_{2}PO_{4} (KDP). Indeed, such crystals motivated the study of ice-type models.

In ice, each oxygen atom is connected by a bond to four hydrogens, and each bond contains one hydrogen atom between the terminal oxygens. The hydrogen occupies one of two symmetrically located positions, neither of which is in the middle of the bond. Pauling argued that the allowed configuration of hydrogen atoms is such that there are always exactly two hydrogens close to each oxygen, thus making the local environment imitate that of a water molecule, H_{2}O. Thus, if we take the oxygen atoms as the lattice vertices and the hydrogen bonds as the lattice edges, and if we draw an arrow on a bond which points to the side of the bond on which the hydrogen atom sits, then ice satisfies the ice model. Similar reasoning applies to show that KDP also satisfies the ice model.

In recent years, ice-type models have been explored as descriptions of pyrochlore spin ice and artificial spin ice systems, in which geometrical frustration in the interactions between bistable magnetic moments ("spins") leads to "ice-rule" spin configurations being favoured. Recently such analogies have been extended to explore the circumstances under which spin-ice systems may be accurately described by the Rys F-model.

== Specific choices of vertex energies ==
On the square lattice, the energies $\epsilon_1,\ldots,\epsilon_6$ associated with vertex configurations 1-6 determine the relative probabilities of states, and thus can influence the macroscopic behaviour of the system. The following are common choices for these vertex energies.

=== The ice model ===
When modeling ice, one takes $\epsilon_1=\epsilon_2=\ldots=\epsilon_6=0$, as all permissible vertex configurations are understood to be equally likely. In this case, the partition function $Z$ equals the total number of valid states. This model is known as the ice model (as opposed to an ice-type model).

=== The KDP model of a ferroelectric ===
Slater argued that KDP could be represented by an ice-type model with energies

$$\epsilon_1=\epsilon_2=0, \epsilon_3=\epsilon_4=\epsilon_5=\epsilon_6>0$$

For this model (called the KDP model), the most likely state (the least-energy state) has all horizontal arrows pointing in the same direction, and likewise for all vertical arrows. Such a state is a ferroelectric state, in which all hydrogen atoms have a preference for one fixed side of their bonds.

=== Rys F model of an antiferroelectric ===
The Rys $F$ model is obtained by setting

$$\epsilon_1=\epsilon_2=\epsilon_3=\epsilon_4>0, \epsilon_5=\epsilon_6=0.$$

The least-energy state for this model is dominated by vertex configurations 5 and 6. For such a state, adjacent horizontal bonds necessarily have arrows in opposite directions and similarly for vertical bonds, so this state is an antiferroelectric state.

=== The zero field assumption ===
If there is no ambient electric field, then the total energy of a state should remain unchanged under a charge reversal, i.e. under flipping all arrows. Thus one may assume without loss of generality that

$$\epsilon_1=\epsilon_2, \quad \epsilon_3=\epsilon_4, \quad \epsilon_5=\epsilon_6$$

This assumption is known as the zero field assumption, and holds for the ice model, the KDP model, and the Rys F model.

== History ==
The ice rule was introduced by Linus Pauling in 1935 to account for the residual entropy of ice that had been measured by William F. Giauque and J. W. Stout. The residual entropy, $S$, of ice is given by the formula

$$S= k_{\rm B}\log Z = k_{\rm B}\, N \, \log W,$$

where $k_{\rm B}$ is the Boltzmann constant, $N$ is the number of oxygen atoms in the piece of ice, which is always taken to be large (the thermodynamic limit) and $Z=W^N$ is the number of configurations of the hydrogen atoms according to Pauling's ice rule. Without the ice rule we would have $W =4$ since the number of hydrogen atoms is $2N$ and each hydrogen has two possible locations. Pauling estimated that the ice rule reduces this to $W =1.5$, a number that would agree extremely well with the Giauque-Stout measurement of $S$. It can be said that Pauling's calculation of $S$ for ice is one of the simplest, yet most accurate applications of statistical mechanics to real substances ever made. The question that remained was whether, given the model, Pauling's calculation of $W$, which was very approximate, would be sustained by a rigorous calculation. This became a significant problem in combinatorics.

Both the three-dimensional and two-dimensional models were computed numerically by John F. Nagle in 1966 who found that $W = 1.50685 \pm 0.00015$ in three-dimensions and $W= 1.540 \pm0.001$ in two-dimensions. Both are amazingly close to Pauling's rough calculation, 1.5.

In 1967, Lieb found the exact solution of three two-dimensional ice-type models: the ice model, the Rys $F$ model, and the KDP model. The solution for the ice model gave the exact value of $W$ in two-dimensions as

$$W_{2D} = \left(\frac{4}{3}\right)^{3/2} = 1.5396007....$$

which is known as Lieb's square ice constant.

Later in 1967, T. Bill Sutherland generalised Lieb's solution of the three specific ice-type models to a general exact solution for square-lattice ice-type models satisfying the zero field assumption.

Still later in 1967, C. P. Yang generalised Sutherland's solution to an exact solution for square-lattice ice-type models in a horizontal electric field.

In 1969, John Nagle derived the exact solution for a three-dimensional version of the KDP model, for a specific range of temperatures. For such temperatures, the model is "frozen" in the sense that (in the thermodynamic limit) the energy per vertex and entropy per vertex are both zero. This is the only known exact solution for a three-dimensional ice-type model.

== Relation to eight-vertex model ==
The eight-vertex model, which has also been exactly solved, is a generalisation of the (square-lattice) six-vertex model: to recover the six-vertex model from the eight-vertex model, set the energies for vertex configurations 7 and 8 to infinity. Six-vertex models have been solved in some cases for which the eight-vertex model has not; for example, Nagle's solution for the three-dimensional KDP model and Yang's solution of the six-vertex model in a horizontal field.

== Boundary conditions ==
This ice model provide an important 'counterexample' in statistical mechanics: the bulk free energy in the thermodynamic limit depends on boundary conditions. The model was analytically solved for periodic boundary conditions, anti-periodic, ferromagnetic and domain wall boundary conditions. The six vertex model with domain wall boundary conditions on a square lattice has specific significance in combinatorics, it helps to enumerate alternating sign matrices. In this case the partition function can be represented as a determinant of a matrix (whose dimension is equal to the size of the lattice), but in other cases the enumeration of $W$ does not come out in such a simple closed form.

Clearly, the largest $W$ is given by free boundary conditions (no constraint at all on the configurations on the boundary), but the same $W$ occurs, in the thermodynamic limit, for periodic boundary conditions, as used originally to derive $W_{2D}$.

== 3-colorings of a lattice ==
The number of states of an ice type model on the internal edges of a finite simply connected union of squares of a lattice is equal to one third of the number of ways to 3-color the squares, with no two adjacent squares having the same color. This correspondence between states is due to Andrew Lenard and is given as follows. If a square has color i = 0, 1, or 2, then the arrow on the edge to an adjacent square goes left or right (according to an observer in the square) depending on whether the color in the adjacent square is i+1 or i−1 mod 3. There are 3 possible ways to color a fixed initial square, and once this initial color is chosen this gives a 1:1 correspondence between colorings and arrangements of arrows satisfying the ice-type condition.

== See also ==
- Eight-vertex model
