= Ehrenpreis's fundamental principle =

In mathematical analysis, Ehrenpreis's fundamental principle, introduced by Leon Ehrenpreis, states:

Every solution of a system (in general, overdetermined) of homogeneous partial differential equations with constant coefficients can be represented as the integral with respect to an appropriate Radon measure over the complex “characteristic variety” of the system.
