= Dmitrii Treschev =

Russian mathematician and mathematical physicist

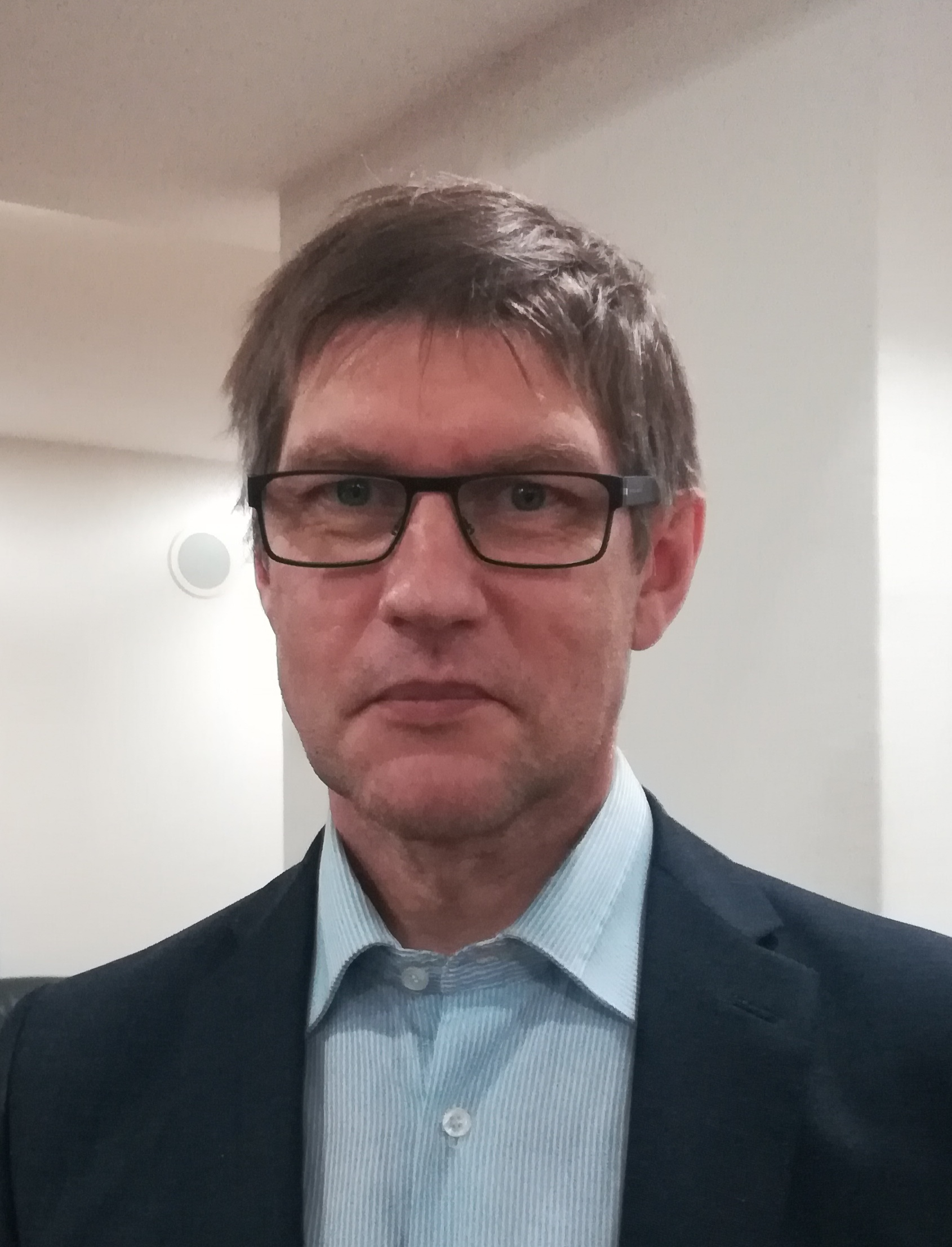
Dmitrii Treschev

Dmitrii (or Dmitry) Valerevich Treschev (Дмитрий Валерьевич Трещёв, born 25 October 1964 im Olenegorsk, Murmansk Oblast) is a Russian mathematician and mathematical physicist, specializing in dynamical systems of classical mechanics.

== Education and career ==
Treschev completed his secondary study in 1981 with degree from the Специализированный учебно-научный центр (СУНЦ) МГУ имени А.Н. Колмогорова (Specialized Educational and Scientific Center, МГУ, Physics and Mathematics Boarding School No. 18 named after A. N. Kolmogorov). Treschev completed his undergraduate study in 1986 with degree from the Faculty of Mechanics and Mathematics, Moscow State University. There in 1988 he received his Candidate of Sciences degree (PhD) with thesis Геометрические методы исследования периодических траекторий динамических систем (Geometric methods of investigation of periodic trajectories of dynamical systems) under the supervision of Valerii Vasilievich Kozlov. In 1992 Treschev received his Russian Doctor of Sciences degree (habilitation) with thesis Качественные методы исследования гамильтоновых систем, близких к интегрируемым (Qualitative methods for studying Hamiltonian systems close to integrable).

At the secondary school СУНЦ, Treschev taught as a professor in the Department of Mathematics from 1986 until his resignation. At Moscow State University, he is since 1993 a leading researcher, since 1998 a professor, and since 2006 head of the Department of Theoretical Mechanics. At the Steklov Institute he became in 2005 a chief researcher and the deputy director for research and is since 2017 the director for research. He is the author or coauthor of over 70 scientific publications. Together with V. V. Kozlov, he supervises the seminar Избранные задачи классической динамики (Selected problems of classical dynamics).

Treschev's research deals with integrability and non-integrability, dynamical stability, KAM theory, separatrix splitting, averaging in slow-fast systems, chaos in Hamiltonian dynamics, Arnold diffusion, statistical mechanics, and ergodic theory. He has served on the editorial boards of the journals Nonlinearity (1st published in 1988), Chaos, Mathematical Notes, and Regular and Chaotic Dynamics (first published in 2007).

In 1995 Treschev was a Laureate of the State Prize of the Russian Federation for young scientists. In 2007 he was awarded the Lyapunov Prize. He was elected in 2003 a corresponding member and in 2016 a full member of the Russian Academy of Sciences. In 2002 he was an invited speaker with talk Continuous averaging in dynamical systems at the International Congress of Mathematicians in Beijing.

== Selected publications ==
=== Articles ===
- Treschev, D. V. (1989). "The mechanism of destruction of resonance tori of Hamiltonian systems". Matematicheskii Sbornik. 180 (10): 1325–1346.
- Neishtadt, A. I.; Simó, C.; Treschev, D. V. (1996). "On stability loss delay for a periodic trajectory". Nonlinear Dynamical Systems and Chaos. pp. 253–278. doi:10.1007/978-3-0348-7518-9_12. ISBN 978-3-0348-7520-2.
- Bolotin, S.; Treschev, D. (1999). "Unbounded growth of energy in nonautonomous Hamiltonian systems". Nonlinearity. 12 (2): 365–388. Bibcode:1999Nonli..12..365B. doi:10.1088/0951-7715/12/2/013. S2CID 250852828.
- Bolotin, S.V.; Treschev, D.V. (2000). "Remarks on the definition of hyperbolic tori of Hamiltonian systems". Regular and Chaotic Dynamics. 5 (4): 401. doi:10.1070/RD2000v005n04ABEH000156 (inactive 12 July 2025).
- Treschev, D. (2002). "Multidimensional Symplectic Separatrix Maps". Journal of Nonlinear Science. 12 (1): 27–58. Bibcode:2002JNS....12...27T. doi:10.1007/s00332-001-0460-2. S2CID 14606817.
- Treschev, D. (2004). "Evolution of slow variables ina prioriunstable Hamiltonian systems". Nonlinearity. 17 (5): 1803–1841. Bibcode:2004Nonli..17.1803T. doi:10.1088/0951-7715/17/5/014. S2CID 250743761.
- Piftankin, Gennadii N.; Treschev, Dmitrii V. (2007). "Separatrix maps in Hamiltonian systems". Russian Mathematical Surveys. 62 (2): 219–322. Bibcode:2007RuMaS..62..219P. doi:10.1070/RM2007v062n02ABEH004396. S2CID 250832875.
- Treschev, D. (2013). "Billiard map and rigid rotation". Physica D: Nonlinear Phenomena. 255: 31–34. Bibcode:2013PhyD..255...31T. doi:10.1016/j.physd.2013.04.003.
- Bolotin, S. V.; Treschev, D. V. (2015). "The anti-integrable limit". Russian Mathematical Surveys. 70 (6): 975–1030. Bibcode:2015RuMaS..70..975B. doi:10.1070/RM2015v070n06ABEH004972. S2CID 115882451.

=== Books ===
- Kozlov, Valeriĭ V.; Treshchëv, Dmitriĭ V. (5 August 1991). Billiards: A Genetic Introduction to the Dynamics of Systems with Impacts: A Genetic Introduction to the Dynamics of Systems with Impacts. American Mathematical Soc. ISBN 9780821845509.
- Treschev, Dmitry; Zubelevich, Oleg (8 October 2009). Introduction to the Perturbation Theory of Hamiltonian Systems. Springer. ISBN 9783642030284. Introduction to the Perturbation Theory of Hamiltonian Systems. Springer Monographs in Mathematics. SpringerLink. 2010. doi:10.1007/978-3-642-03028-4. ISBN 978-3-642-03027-7.
