= Leon Takhtajan =

Russian-Soviet mathematical physicist

- Born: 1 October 1950 (age 75); Yerevan, Soviet Union
- Education: Steklov Institute
- Known for: algebraic Bethe ansatz FRT construction
- Relatives: Armen Takhtajan (father)
- Scientific career
- Fields: Mathematical physics
- Workplaces: Steklov Institute; Stony Brook University
- Doctoral advisor: Ludvig Faddeev

Leon Armenovich Takhtajan (Armenian: Լևոն Թախտաջյան; Russian: Леон Арменович Тахтаджян, born 1 October 1950, Yerevan) is a Russian (and formerly Soviet) mathematical physicist of Armenian descent, currently a professor of mathematics at the Stony Brook University, Stony Brook, NY, and a leading researcher at the Euler International Mathematical Institute, Saint Petersburg, Russia.

== Biography ==
Leon Armenovich Takhtajan was born in Yerevan, Soviet Union, in 1950, son of the Armenian Russian botanist Armen Takhtajan.

=== Education ===
Takhtajan received in 1975 his Ph.D. (Russian candidate degree) from the Steklov Institute (Leningrad Department) under Ludvig Faddeev with thesis Complete Integrability of the Equation $u_{tt}-u_{xx}+\sin (u)=0$. He was then employed at the Steklov Institute (Leningrad Department) and in 1982 received his D.S. degree (doctor of science, 2nd degree in Russia) with thesis Completely integrable models of field theory and statistical mechanics.

=== Career ===
Since 1992 he has been a professor at Stony Brook University where he was the chair of the mathematics department in 2009–2013.

== Research ==
His research is on integrable systems of mathematical physics (such as the theory of solitons) and applications of quantum field theories and models of string theory to algebraic geometry and complex analysis. It includes quantum field theories on algebraic curves and associated reciprocity laws, two-dimensional quantum gravity and Weil–Petersson geometry of moduli spaces, the Kähler geometry of universal Teichmüller space, and trace formulas. His major contributions are in the theory of classical and quantum integrable systems, quantum groups and Weil–Petersson geometry of moduli spaces. Together with Ludvig Faddeev and Evgeny Sklyanin he formulated the algebraic Bethe ansatz and quantum inverse scattering method. Together with Ludvig Faddeev and Nicolai Reshetikhin he proposed a method of quantization of Lie groups and algebras called the FRT construction. In 1983 he was an invited speaker at the International Congress of Mathematicians in Warsaw, Poland and gave a talk titled Integrable models in classical and quantum field theory.

== Selected publications ==
=== Articles ===
- Sklyanin, E. K.; Takhtadzhyan, L. A.; Faddeev, L. D. (1980). "Quantum inverse problem method I". Theoretical and Mathematical Physics. 40 (2): 688. Bibcode:1979TMP....40..688S. doi:10.1007/BF01018718. S2CID 120710212.
- Takhtadzhan, L. A.; Faddeev, Lyudvig D. (1979). "The quantum method of the inverse problem and the XYZ Heisenberg model". Russian Mathematical Surveys. 34 (5): 11. Bibcode:1979RuMaS..34...11T. doi:10.1070/RM1979v034n05ABEH003909. S2CID 250867355.
- Решетихин Н. Ю., Тахтаджян Л. А., Фаддеев Л. Д. Квантование групп Ли и алгебр Ли — Алгебра и анализ, 1:1 (1989), Eng. translation:
  - Faddeev, L. D.; Reshetikhin, N. Yu.; Takhtajan, L. A. (1990). "Quantization of Lie Groups and Lie Algebras". Leningrad Mathematical Journal. 1 (1): 193–225. MR 1015339.
  - Faddeev, L. D.; Reshetikhin, N. Yu.; Takhtajan, L. A. (1988). "Quantization of Lie Groups and Lie Algebras". Algebraic Analysis: Papers Dedicated to Professor Mikioi Sato on the Occasion of His Sixtieth Birthday. Academic Press. ISBN 9781483268026. MR 0992450.
  - Faddeev, L. D.; Reshetikhin, N. Yu.; Takhtajan, L. A. (1990). "Quantization of Lie Groups and Lie Algebras". In Jimbo, Michio (ed.). Yang-Baxter Equation in Integrable Systems. Advanced Series in Mathematical Physics. Vol. 10. World Scientific. pp. 299–309. Bibcode:1990ybei.book..299F. doi:10.1142/9789812798336_0016. ISBN 978-981-02-0120-3.
- Takhtajan, Leon (1994). "On foundation of the generalized Nambu mechanics". Communications in Mathematical Physics. 160 (2): 295–315. arXiv:hep-th/9301111. Bibcode:1994CMaPh.160..295T. doi:10.1007/BF02103278. S2CID 119137896.
- Zograf, P. G.; Takhtadzhyan, L. A. (1988). "On uniformization of Riemann surfaces and the Weil–Petersson metric on Teichmüller and Schottky spaces". Mathematics of the USSR-Sbornik. 60 (2): 297. Bibcode:1988SbMat..60..297Z. doi:10.1070/SM1988v060n02ABEH003170.

=== Books ===
- Faddeev, Ludwig; Takhtajan, Leon (2007) [First published 1987]. Hamiltonian methods in the theory of solitons (2nd ed.). Springer Verlag. ISBN 9783540699699.
- Weil–Petersson Metric on the Universal Teichmuller Space. Vol. 183. Memoirs of the Amer. Math. Soc. 2006. MR 2251887.
- Quantum mechanics for mathematicians. American Mathematical Society. 2008. MR 2433906.
