= Inozemtsev model =

Statistical lattice model with long-range interactions

In quantum statistical physics, the Inozemtsev model is a spin chain, defined on a one-dimensional, periodic lattice. Unlike the prototypical Heisenberg spin chain, which only includes interactions between neighboring sites of the lattice, the Inozemtsev model has long-range interactions, that is, interactions between any pair of sites, regardless of the distance between them.

It was introduced in 1990 by Vladimir Inozemtsev as a model which interpolates between the Heisenberg XXX model and the Haldane–Shastry model. Like those spin chains, the Inozemtsev model is exactly solvable.

== Formulation ==
For a chain with $L$ spin 1/2 sites, the quantum phase space is described by the tensor product Hilbert space $\mathcal{H} = (\mathbb{C}^2)^{\otimes L}$. The (elliptic) Inozemtsev model is given by the (unnormalised) Hamiltonian
$$H = \sum_{i < j}^L \wp(i - j)\frac{1 - \vec \sigma_i \cdot \vec \sigma_j}{2}$$
where the pair potential $\wp(z)$ is the Weierstrass elliptic function, and $\vec{\sigma}_j$ denotes the Pauli vector at the $j$th site (acting nontrivially on the $j$th copy of $\mathbb{C}^2$ in $\mathcal{H}$). The periods of the Weierstrass elliptic function are the length $L$ of the chain, to ensure periodic boundary conditions, together with an imaginary period that sets the interaction range and is traditionally parameterized as $\omega = i \, \pi/\kappa$ where $\kappa>0$. The truly long-range Haldane-Shastry chain is obtained when the imaginary period is removed ($\omega \to i \,\infty$, so $\kappa\to 0$) while, upon renormalisation, the Heisenberg spin chain is recovered in the limit $\omega \to i \, 0^+$ ($\kappa \to \infty$). The infinite-length limit $L\to\infty$ instead gives hyperbolic potential $1/\sinh^2(\kappa(i-j))$, which is why the resulting spin chain is sometimes called the hyperbolic (as opposed to elliptic) Inozemtsev chain.

== Exact solution ==
The system has been exactly solved by means of an 'extended' Bethe ansatz method. The model was solved by Inozemtsev first in the infinite lattice size limit, and later for finite size.

== AdS/CFT correspondence ==
The model can be used to understand certain aspects of the AdS/CFT correspondence proposed by Maldacena. Specifically, integrability techniques have turned out to be useful for an 'integrable' instance of the correspondence. On the string theory side of the correspondence, one has a type IIB superstring on $\mathrm{AdS}_5 \times \mathrm{S}^5$, the product of five-dimensional Anti-de Sitter space with the five-dimensional sphere. On the conformal field theory (CFT) side one has N = 4 supersymmetric Yang–Mills theory (N = 4 SYM) on four-dimensional space.

Spin chains have turned out to be useful for computing specific anomalous dimensions on the CFT side, which can then provide evidence for the correspondence if matching observables are computed on the string theory side. In the so-called 'planar limit' or 'large $N$' limit of N = 4 SYM, in which the number of colors $N$, which parametrizes the gauge group $SU(N)$, is sent to infinity, determining one-loop anomalous dimensions becomes equivalent to the problem of diagonalizing an appropriate spin chain. The Inozemtsev model is one such model which has been useful in determining these quantities. While the match only holds up to three loops in perturbation theory, and its appearance might thus have been somewhat of a coincidence, this development has brought the Inozemtsev chain under the attention of a wider audience of researchers.

== See also ==
- Quantum Heisenberg model
- Haldane–Shastry model
