= Quantum inverse scattering method =

Method used to solve integrable many-body quantum systems

In quantum physics, the quantum inverse scattering method, similar to the closely related algebraic Bethe ansatz, is a method for solving integrable models in 1+1 dimensions, introduced by Leon Takhtajan and L. D. Faddeev in 1979.

It can be viewed as a quantized version of the classical inverse scattering method pioneered by Norman Zabusky and Martin Kruskal used to investigate the Korteweg–de Vries equation and later other integrable partial differential equations. In both, a Lax matrix features heavily and scattering data is used to construct solutions to the original system.

While the classical inverse scattering method is used to solve integrable partial differential equations which model continuous media (for example, the KdV equation models shallow water waves), the quantum inverse scattering method is used to solve many-body quantum systems, sometimes known as spin chains, of which the Heisenberg spin chain is the best-studied and most famous example. These are typically discrete systems, with particles fixed at different points of a lattice, but limits of results obtained by the quantum inverse scattering method can give predictions even for field theories defined on a continuum, such as the quantum sine-Gordon model.

== Discussion ==
The quantum inverse scattering method relates two different approaches:

1. The Bethe ansatz, a method of solving integrable quantum models in one space and one time dimension.
2. The inverse scattering transform, a method of solving classical integrable differential equations of the evolutionary type.

This method led to the formulation of quantum groups, in particular the Yangian. The center of the Yangian, given by the quantum determinant, plays a prominent role in the method.

An important concept in the inverse scattering transform is the Lax representation. The quantum inverse scattering method starts by the quantization of the Lax representation and reproduces the results of the Bethe ansatz. In fact, it allows the Bethe ansatz to be written in a new form: the algebraic Bethe ansatz. This led to further progress in the understanding of quantum integrable systems, such as the quantum Heisenberg model, the quantum nonlinear Schrödinger equation (also known as the Lieb–Liniger model or the Tonks–Girardeau gas) and the Hubbard model.

The theory of correlation functions was developed, relating determinant representations, descriptions by differential equations and the Riemann–Hilbert problem. Asymptotics of correlation functions which include space, time and temperature dependence were evaluated in 1991.

Explicit expressions for the higher conservation laws of the integrable models were obtained in 1989.

Essential progress was achieved in study of ice-type models: the bulk free energy of the six vertex model depends on boundary conditions even in the thermodynamic limit.

== Procedure ==
The steps can be summarized as follows (after Evgeny Sklyanin):

1. Take an R-matrix which solves the Yang–Baxter equation.
2. Take a representation of an algebra $\mathcal{T}_R$ satisfying the RTT relations.
3. Find the spectrum of the generating function $t(u)$ of the centre of $\mathcal{T}_R$.
4. Find correlators.
