= Lewi Tonks =

American quantum physicist (1897–1971)

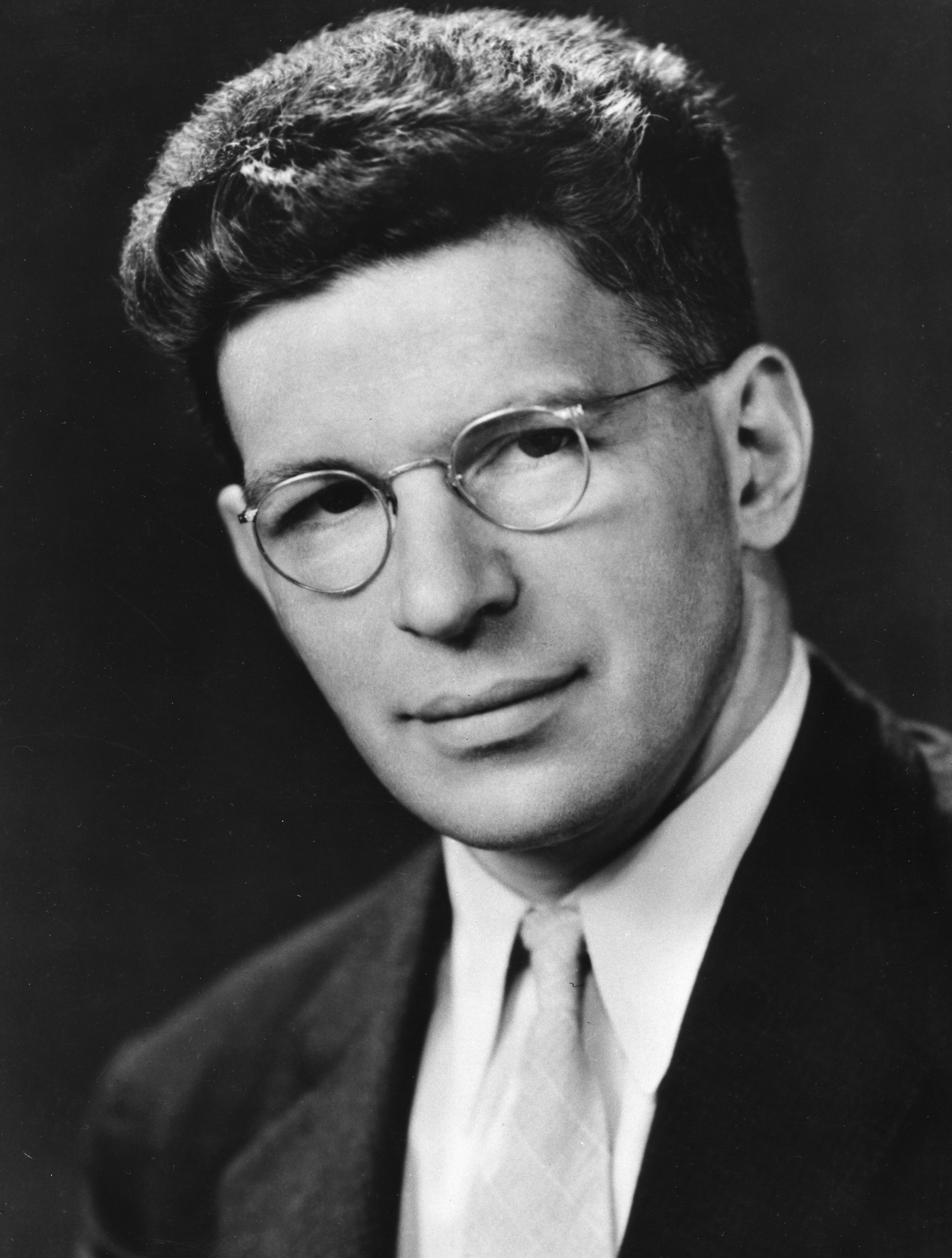
- Born: December 13, 1897; New York City, U.S.
- Died: July 30, 1971 (aged 73); Glen Ridge, New Jersey, U.S.
- Education: Columbia University
- Known for: Plasma oscillation Tonks–Girardeau gas
- Political party: Socialist
- Scientific career
- Fields: Physics
- Workplaces: General Electric

Lewi Tonks (December 13, 1897 – July 30, 1971) was an American physicist who worked for General Electric on microwaves, plasma physics and nuclear reactors. Under Irving Langmuir, his work pioneered the study of plasma oscillations. He is also noted for the noted for his discovery (with Marvin D. Girardeau) of the Tonks–Girardeau gas.

Nuclear physicist Arthur Edward Ruark once said that "any international conference on plasma physics and controlled thermonuclear research without Lewi Tonks present would be something like Hamlet without the ghost, and without Hamlet".

== Life ==
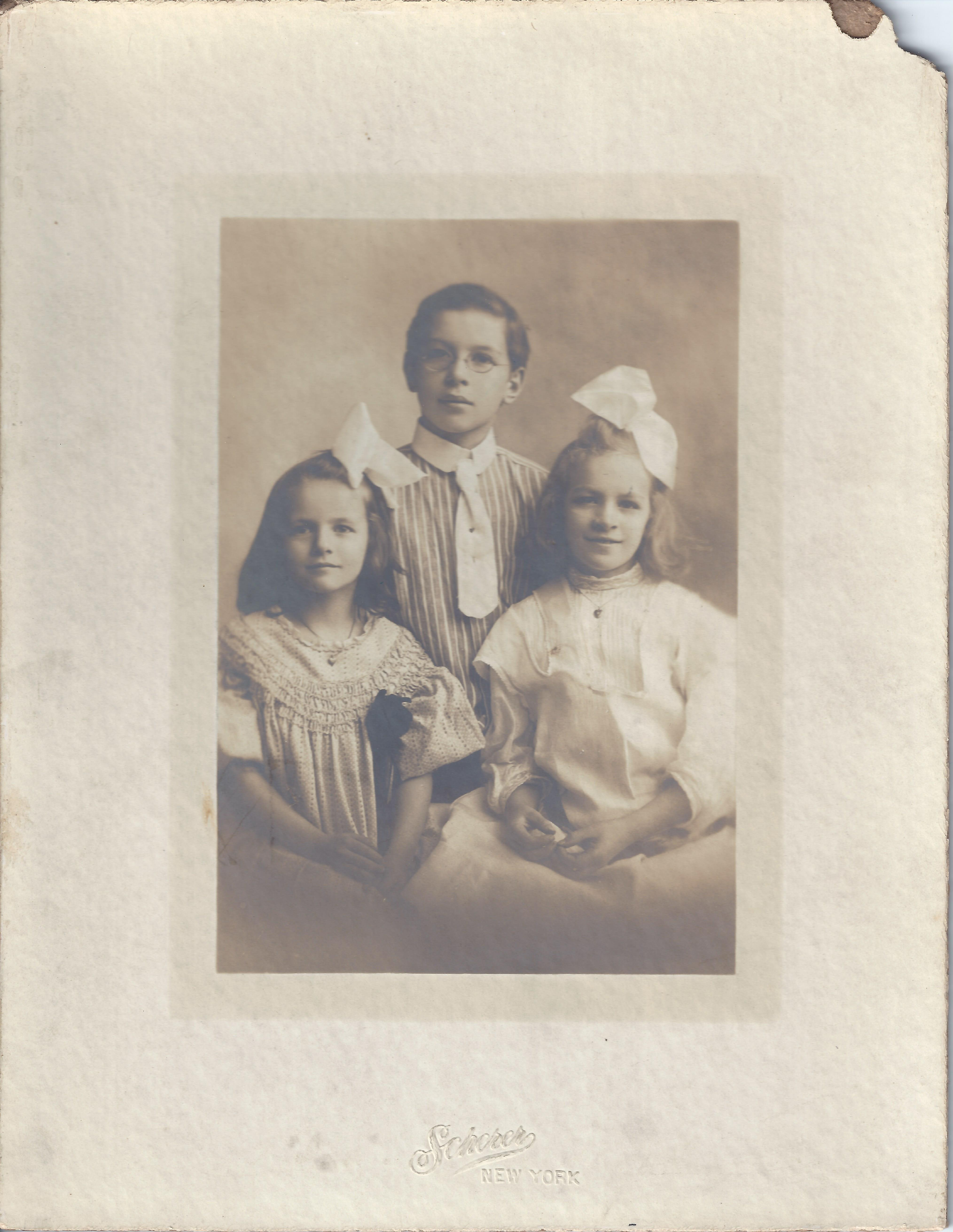
Portrait of Tonks and his sisters Nina and Emily by Scherer c. 1909

Lewi I. Tonks was born in New York City on December 13, 1897.

He obtained a Bachelor of Science degree from Columbia University in 1918, and there completed his PhD in mathematical physics in 1923.

In 1921, he attended the lectures of Albert Einstein who was visiting Columbia University. Tonks also became a translator of Einstein's paper for The New York Times.

His studies were interrupted during World War I, where he conducted research at the New London Connecticut Naval Station on sonar for submarine detection systems.

He joined General Electric in 1923 where he worked under Irving Langmuir, who was the associate director of the research lab. Tonks' research focused on thermionic emission, ferromagnetism, and magnetrons from microwave generation. During World War II, he headed the General Electric research group on jamming magnetrons.

Tonks advocated the use of a logarithmic pressure scale for vacuum technology to replace the torr.

In 1929, Tonks and Langmuir published a paper on plasma oscillation. The same year they also developed a general theory of plasma.

Tonks campaigned on Vietnam War issues. Tonks was part of the Clergy and Layman Concerned About Vietnam. In 1934, he ran for the U.S. House of Representatives from New York's 30th congressional district as a member of the Socialist Party, earning 2.5% of the vote. He ran again in 1936, winning 1.9%.

Tonks became a fellow of the American Physical Society in 1931. He was also member of the American Nuclear Society, American Association for the Advancement of Science and secretary of the Federation of American Scientists.

Tonks also participated in WGY radio station in the Science Forum broadcast, answering the question of the listeners on scientific matters.

In 1946, Tonks became associated to the Knolls Atomic Power Laboratory, operated by General Electric for the U.S. Atomic Energy Commission. There he worked on the theory of nuclear reactor shielding and neutron diffusion in reactors. He made one of the first design of the Model D stellarator with for fusion power.

=== Later life ===
Tonks retired in from General Electrics in 1963. He then worked as a volunteer for the Schenectady Human Rights Commission.

In July 1971, Tonks died of a heart attack at the age of 74 in Glen Ridge, New Jersey. He left his wife and three children.

After his death, his collected papers containing correspondence, both personal and professional, research notes, drafts of papers and completed research papers from 1930's to the 1960s passed to his wife. Shortly thereafter, the collection was deposited at the Niels Bohr Library of the American Institute of Physics in College Park, Maryland.

== See also ==
- ZETA (fusion reactor)
- Super Tonks-Girardeau gas
