= Gaudin model =

Physics model in statistical mechanics

In physics, the Gaudin model, sometimes known as the quantum Gaudin model, is a model, or a large class of models, in statistical mechanics first described in its simplest case by Michel Gaudin. They are exactly solvable models, and are also examples of quantum spin chains.

== History ==
The simplest case was first described by Michel Gaudin in 1976, with the associated Lie algebra taken to be $\mathfrak{sl}_2$, the two-dimensional special linear group.

== Mathematical formulation ==
Let $\mathfrak{g}$ be a semi-simple Lie algebra of finite dimension $d$.

Let $N$ be a positive integer. On the complex plane $\mathbb{C}$, choose $N$ different points, $z_i$.

Denote by $V_\lambda$ the finite-dimensional irreducible representation of $\mathfrak{g}$ corresponding to the dominant integral element $\lambda$. Let $(\boldsymbol{\lambda}) := (\lambda_1, \cdots, \lambda_N)$ be a set of dominant integral weights of $\mathfrak{g}$. Define the tensor product $V_{(\boldsymbol{\lambda})}:=V_{\lambda_1}\otimes \cdots \otimes V_{\lambda_N}$.

The model is then specified by a set of operators $H_i$ acting on $V_{(\boldsymbol{\lambda})}$, known as the Gaudin Hamiltonians. They are described as follows.

Denote by $\langle \cdot ,\cdot\rangle$ the invariant scalar product on $\mathfrak{g}$ (this is often taken to be the Killing form). Let $\{I_a\}$ be a basis of $\mathfrak{g}$ and $\{I^a\}$ be the dual basis given through the scalar product. For an element $A\in \mathfrak{g}$, denote by $A^{(i)}$ the operator $1\otimes\cdots\otimes A \otimes \cdots \otimes 1$ which acts as $A$ on the $i$th factor of $V_{(\boldsymbol{\lambda})}$ and as identity on the other factors. Then

$$H_i = \sum_{j \neq i} \sum_{a=1}^{d}\frac{I_a^{(i)}I^{a(j)}}{z_i - z_j}.$$

These operators are mutually commuting. One problem of interest in the theory of Gaudin models is finding simultaneous eigenvectors and eigenvalues of these operators.

Instead of working with the multiple Gaudin Hamiltonians, there is another operator $S(u)$, sometimes referred to as the Gaudin Hamiltonian. It depends on a complex parameter $u$, and also on the quadratic Casimir, which is an element of the universal enveloping algebra $U(\mathfrak{g})$, defined as
$$\Delta = \frac{1}{2}\sum_{a=1}^d I_a I^a.$$
This acts on representations $V_{(\boldsymbol{\lambda})}$ by multiplying by a number dependent on the representation, denoted $\Delta(\lambda)$. This is sometimes referred to as the index of the representation. The Gaudin Hamiltonian is then defined
$$S(u) = \sum_{i=1}^N \left[\frac{H_i}{u - z_i} + \frac{\Delta(\lambda_i)}{(u - z_i)^2}\right].$$
Commutativity of $S(u)$ for different values of $u$ follows from the commutativity of the $H_i$.

=== Higher Gaudin Hamiltonians ===
When $\mathfrak{g}$ has rank greater than 1, the commuting algebra spanned by the Gaudin Hamiltonians and the identity can be expanded to a larger commuting algebra, known as the Gaudin algebra. Similarly to the Harish-Chandra isomorphism, these commuting elements have associated degrees, and in particular the Gaudin Hamiltonians form the degree 2 part of the algebra. For $\mathfrak{g} = \mathfrak{sl}_2$, the Gaudin Hamiltonians and the identity span the Gaudin algebra. There is another commuting algebra which is 'universal', underlying the Gaudin algebra for any choice of sites and weights, called the Feigin–Frenkel center. See here.

Then eigenvectors of the Gaudin algebra define linear functionals on the algebra. If $X$ is an element of the Gaudin algebra $\mathfrak{G}$, and $v$ an eigenvector of the Gaudin algebra, one obtains a linear functional $\chi_v: \mathfrak{G} \rightarrow \mathbb{C}$ given by
$$Xv = \chi_v(X)v.$$
The linear functional $\chi_v$ is called a character of the Gaudin algebra. The spectral problem, that is, determining eigenvalues and simultaneous eigenvectors of the Gaudin algebra, then becomes a matter of determining characters on the Gaudin algebra.

== Solutions ==
A solution to a Gaudin model often means determining the spectrum of the Gaudin Hamiltonian or Gaudin Hamiltonians. There are several methods of solution, including

- Algebraic Bethe ansatz, used by Gaudin
- Separation of variables, used by Sklyanin
- Correlation functions/opers, using a method described by Feigin, Frenkel and Reshetikhin.

=== Algebraic Bethe ansatz ===
==== For sl_{2} ====
For $\mathfrak{g} = \mathfrak{sl}_2$, let $\{E, H, F\}$ be the standard basis. For any $X \in \mathfrak{g}$, one can define the operator-valued meromorphic function
$$X(z) = \sum_{i = 1}^N\frac{X^{(i)}}{z - z_i}.$$
Its residue at $z = z_i$ is $X^{(i)}$, while $\lim_{z \rightarrow \infty} zX(z) = \sum_{i = 1}^N X^{(i)} =: X^{(\infty)},$ the 'full' tensor representation.

The $X(z)$ and $X^{(\infty)}$ satisfy several useful properties

- $[X(z), Y^{(\infty)}] = [X, Y](z)$
- $S(u) = \frac{1}{2}\sum_a I_a(z) I^a(z)$
- $[H_i, X^{(\infty)}] = 0$

but the $X(z)$ do not form a representation: $[X(z), Y(z)] = -[X,Y]'(z)$. The third property is useful as it allows us to also diagonalize with respect to $H^{\infty}$, for which a diagonal (but degenerate) basis is known.

For an $\mathfrak{sl}_2$ Gaudin model specified by sites $z_1, \cdots, z_N \in \mathbb{C}$ and weights $\lambda_1, \cdots, \lambda_N \in \mathbb{N}$, define the vacuum vector to be the tensor product of the highest weight states from each representation: $v_0 := v_{\lambda_1}\otimes \cdots \otimes v_{\lambda_N}$.

A Bethe vector (of spin deviation $m$) is a vector of the form
$$F(w_1)\cdots F(w_m)v_0$$
for $w_i \in \mathbb{C}$. Guessing eigenvectors of the form of Bethe vectors is the Bethe ansatz. It can be shown that a Bethe vector is an eigenvector of the Gaudin Hamiltonians if the set of equations
$$\sum_{i = 1}^N \frac{\lambda_i}{w_k - z_i} - 2 \sum_{j \neq k} \frac{1}{w_k - w_j} = 0$$
holds for each $k$ between 1 and $m$. These are the Bethe ansatz equations for spin deviation $m$. For $m = 1$, this reduces to
$$\boldsymbol{\lambda}(w) := \sum_{i = 1}^N \frac{\lambda_i}{w - z_i} = 0.$$

==== Completeness ====
In theory, the Bethe ansatz equations can be solved to give the eigenvectors and eigenvalues of the Gaudin Hamiltonian. In practice, if the equations are to completely solve the spectral problem, one must also check

- The number of solutions predicted by the Bethe equations
- The multiplicity of solutions

If, for a specific configuration of sites and weights, the Bethe ansatz generates all eigenvectors, then it is said to be complete for that configuration of Gaudin model. It is possible to construct examples of Gaudin models which are incomplete. One problem in the theory of Gaudin models is then to determine when a given configuration is complete or not, or at least characterize the 'space of models' for which the Bethe ansatz is complete.

For $\mathfrak{g} = \mathfrak{sl}_2$, for $z_i$ in general position the Bethe ansatz is known to be complete. Even when the Bethe ansatz is not complete, in this case it is due to the multiplicity of a root being greater than one in the Bethe ansatz equations, and it is possible to find a complete basis by defining generalized Bethe vectors.

Conversely, for $\mathfrak{g} = \mathfrak{sl}_3$, there exist specific configurations for which completeness fails due to the Bethe ansatz equations having no solutions.

==== For general complex simple g ====
Analogues of the Bethe ansatz equation can be derived for Lie algebras of higher rank. However, these are much more difficult to derive and solve than the $\mathfrak{sl}_2$ case. Furthermore, for $\mathfrak{g}$ of rank greater than 1, that is, all others besides $\mathfrak{sl}_2$, there are higher Gaudin Hamiltonians, for which it is unknown how to generalize the Bethe ansatz.

=== ODE/IM isomorphism ===
There is an ODE/IM isomorphism between the Gaudin algebra (or the universal Feigin–Frenkel center), which are the 'integrals of motion' for the theory, and opers, which are ordinary differential operators, in this case on $\mathbb{P}^1$.

== Generalizations ==
There exist generalizations arising from weakening the restriction on $\mathfrak{g}$ being a strictly semi-simple Lie algebra. For example, when $\mathfrak{g}$ is allowed to be an affine Lie algebra, the model is called an affine Gaudin model.

A different way to generalize is to pick out a preferred automorphism of a particular Lie algebra $\mathfrak{g}$. One can then define Hamiltonians which transform nicely under the action of the automorphism. One class of such models are cyclotomic Gaudin models.

There is also a notion of classical Gaudin model. Historically, the quantum Gaudin model was defined and studied first, unlike most physical systems. Certain classical integrable field theories can be viewed as classical dihedral affine Gaudin models. Therefore, understanding quantum affine Gaudin models may allow understanding of the integrable structure of quantum integrable field theories.

Such classical field theories include the principal chiral model, coset sigma models and affine Toda field theory.
