= Elliptic algebra =

In algebra, an elliptic algebra is a certain regular algebra of a Gelfand–Kirillov dimension three (quantum polynomial ring in three variables) that corresponds to a cubic divisor in the projective space P^{2}. If the cubic divisor happens to be an elliptic curve, then the algebra is called a Sklyanin algebra. The notion is studied in the context of noncommutative projective geometry.
