= Generalized hydrodynamics =

Field of study in physics

In physics, generalized hydrodynamics (GHD) is an extension of ordinary hydrodynamics to non-equilibrium integrable systems. Such systems have a large number of conserved quantities, leading to hydrodynamics with infinitely many conservation laws. In ordinary hydrodynamics, there exists only a limited number of conservation laws for energy, mass and momentum.

Generalized hydrodynamics started out from the need to model non-equilibrium, but still integrable systems (both quantum and classical).

The equations of GHD are collisionless Boltzmann equations for the stable quasi particle excitations of integrable systems. So unlike ordinary hydrodynamics, that is prone to thermalization (no information of microscopic movement is being kept of), GHD keeps track of all information during the dynamical evolution of the system.

GHD is a relatively new field of study, having evolved from two papers in 2016, although some examples of integrable systems such as Lieb–Liniger model describing cold atomic gasses in one dimension satisfying the Bose-Einstein statistics were considered in 1963. The Bethe ansatz can be seen as a starting point of GHD.

Applications of GHD span from interacting integrable quantum systems, spin transport, quantum dynamics of propagating waves in interacting Bose gases, soliton gases to classical molecular dynamics.

== General framework ==
=== The main equation ===
Generalized hydrodynamics is for now restricted to one-dimensional problems. In such settings, many-body systems display the notion of integrability and the emergent Euler-scale hydrodynamics becomes generalized hydrodynamics instead of classical hydrodynamics.

The central equation of GHD closely resembles both the Euler equations of fluid dynamics and the Liouville equation. It takes the form of a nonlinear integro-differential equation governing the quasiparticle spectral phase-space distribution $\rho_{\lambda}$, given by:

$\partial_t \rho_{\lambda} + \partial_x \left(v^{\text{eff}} \rho_{\lambda}\right)=0,$

where $\rho_{\lambda}(x,\lambda ,t)$ is the density of quasiparticles which depends on space, spectral parameter $\lambda$ (also called rapidity) and time. The effective velocity $v^{\text{eff}}(x,\lambda, t)$ is the velocity of the propagation of the excitations of quasiparticles and depends nonlinearly on the $\rho_{\lambda}$, i.e. it depends nontrivially on the interactions.

If contributions from force fields are included than the equations take the form:

$\partial_t \rho_{\lambda} + \partial_x \left(v^{\text{eff}} \rho_{\lambda}\right)+\partial_{\lambda}\left(a^{\text{eff}}\rho_{\lambda}\right)=0$.

The continuous spectral parameter $\lambda$ enumerates the possible asymptotic objects of the interactions between particles (scattering theory, solitons, etc.), including their momentum and possible internal states. The precise set of $\lambda$ dependts on the model but is usually either $\mathbb R$ or some subset $S \in \mathbb R$. That way, the particles become quasiparticles that now live in spectral phase space.

For a system of non-interacting particles the spectral phase space becomes the regular phase space, the spectral parameter becomes the canonical momentum $\lambda \rightarrow p$ and the equation of motion becomes the single particle Liouville equation:

$\partial_t \rho + \dot{x}\,\partial_x \rho + \dot{p}\,\partial_p \rho = 0,$

or equivalently

$\partial_t \rho + \{\rho, H\} = 0,$

with the usage of Hamilton's equations and Poisson brackets.

The GHD equations are usually solved numerically but the equations themselves have integrable structures and are prone to geometric descriptions from which solutions in terms of a set of integral equations can be obtained.

=== Integrable systems and relaxation time ===
Classical hydrodynamics is based on the assumption that the relaxation time (time needed for a perturbed system to come to equilibrium) of particles is much smaller than the time scale of macroscopic changes, i.e. $\tau_{\text{micro}} \ll \tau_{\text{macro}}$, so that we do not need to track every particle's position and momentum $(q_i,p_i)$ simultaneously but we only need to keep track of bulk properties like density $\rho(\mathbf{r},t)$, velocity $v(\mathbf{r},t)$ and energy density $e(\mathbf{r},t)$ and the whole evolution can be described with a set of PDE's and only those few conserved quantities.

The situation is different in GHD, here the relaxation time is not negligible and the assumption of relaxation can not be used as easily as in classical hydrodynamics.

A conserved quantity $Q$ with the appropriate density $q(x)$ can be expressed as

$Q = \int dx q(x),$

One can now write down $n$ conservation laws (continuity equations) for each conserved quantity of the form:

$\partial_t q_n+\partial_x j_n=0.$

Usually, Hamiltonian integrable systems have a finite number of conserved quantities (namely the Hamiltonian, momentum, angular momentum). The special property of GHD systems is that the number of independent conserves quantities grows linearly with the system's size. Another distinction is that a non-integrable system that is set to evolve starting from a non-equilibrium state it will approach a statistical ensemble the Gibbs ensemble, while the integrable system will evolve to the generalized Gibbs ensemble:

$\rho = \frac{e^{\sum \beta_n Q_n}}{Z}$

where ${Q_n}$ is an infinite family of conserved quantities and $\beta_n$ are generalized chemical potentials.

=== Non-equilibrium states ===
In theory, non-equilibrium statistical mechanics is mathematically exact: ensembles for an isolated system evolve over time according to deterministic equations such as Liouville's equation or its quantum equivalent, the von Neumann equation. These equations are the result of applying the mechanical equations of motion independently to each state in the ensemble. These ensemble evolution equations inherit much of the complexity of the underlying mechanical motion, and so exact solutions are very difficult to obtain. Moreover, the ensemble evolution equations are fully reversible and do not destroy information (the ensemble's Gibbs entropy is preserved).
