= Quantum energy teleportation =

Aspect of quantum information science

Quantum energy teleportation (QET) is an application of quantum information science. It is a variation of the quantum teleportation protocol. Quantum energy teleportation allows energy to be teleported from a sender to a receiver, regardless of location. This protocol works by having the sender inject energy into the quantum vacuum state which the receiver can then extract positive energy from. QET differs from quantum teleportation as instead of information about an unknown state being teleported from a sender to a receiver, energy is transferred instead.

This procedure does not allow faster-than-light transfer of energy and does not allow the spontaneous creation of energy. The sender and receiver share a pair of entangled spins in a spin chain. Energy can be teleported from the sender, Alice, to the receiver, Bob, instantly by using the effects of local operators. However, in order for Bob to extract this energy from his spin he requires a classically communicated signal from Alice. Since this classical signal cannot be transmitted faster than the speed of light, the speed at which energy can be transferred from Alice to Bob is also limited by the speed of light.

Quantum energy teleportation was first proposed conceptually by Masahiro Hotta in 2008. The protocol was first experimentally demonstrated in 2023 by Kazuki Ikeda who used superconducting quantum computers to show the energy teleportation effect.

== QET mechanisms ==
There are two main factors involved in how QET works: how energy is transferred from Alice to Bob, and how Bob can extract energy from his spin.

=== Spin chains ===
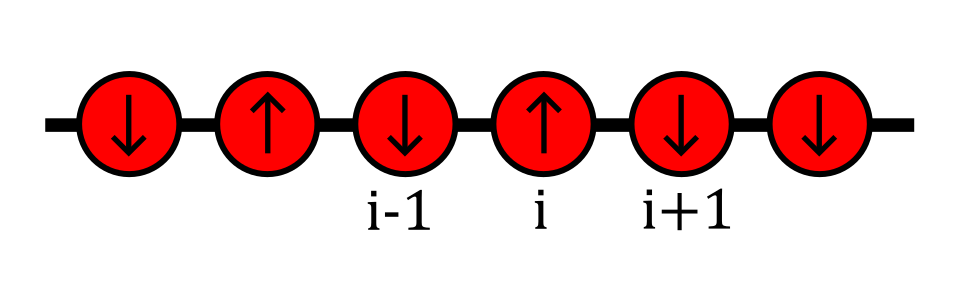
A simplified illustration of the spin chain model. The spin of the ith site can interact with the spins from the i - 1 and i + 1 sites.

QET is studied through analyzing spin chain models. A spin chain is a type of model where a one dimensional chain of sites are assigned certain spin value at each site, typically +1/2 or -1/2 when considering spin-1/2. The spin of one individual site can interact with the spin of its adjacent neighbours, causing the entire system to be coupled together.

Spin chains are useful for QET due to the fact that they can be entangled even in the ground state. This means that even without external energy being added to the system, the ground state exhibits quantum correlations across the chain. Alice and Bob are both in possession of an entangled state from a spin chain system. This can provide a rudimentary explanation of how energy can be transferred from Alice's spin to Bob's spin, since any action on Alice's spin can have an effect on Bob's spin.

=== Vacuum fluctuations ===
The other key component to understanding the QET mechanism is vacuum fluctuations and the presence of negative energy density regions within the energy distribution of a quantum mechanical system. Vacuum fluctuations are a consequence of the Heisenberg uncertainty principle, specifically the uncertainty between the field amplitude and its conjugate momentum, which is analogous to the position-momentum uncertainty principle.

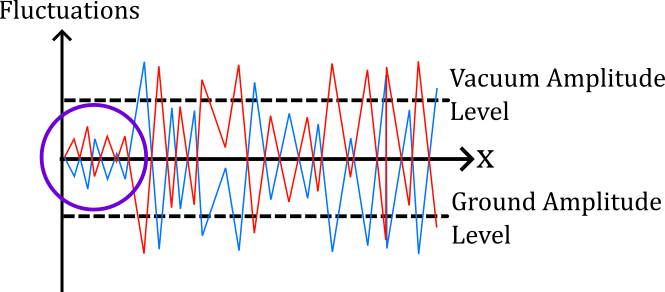
Illustration of the vacuum fluctuations about the zero-point energy. Areas of negative energy density (purple circle) can occur where the amplitude of fluctuations is smaller than the average vacuum fluctuation amplitude.

The commutation relation, $[\varphi(x,y,z),\Pi(x',y',z')]=i\hbar\delta (x-x')\delta(y-y')\delta(z-z')$, gives rise to uncertainty in energy densities at different spatial points. Consequently, the energy fluctuates around the zero-point energy density of the state

The vacuum fluctuations in certain regions can have lower amplitude fluctuations due to the effect of local operations. These regions possess a negative energy density since the vacuum fluctuations already represent the zero-energy state. Therefore, fluctuations of lower amplitude relative to the vacuum fluctuations represent a negative energy density region. Since the entire vacuum state still has zero-energy, there exist other regions with higher vacuum fluctuations with a positive energy density.

Negative energy density in the vacuum fluctuations plays an important role in QET since it allows for the extraction of energy from the vacuum state. Positive energy can be extracted from regions of positive energy density which can be created by regions of negative density region elsewhere in the vacuum state.

== QET in a spin chain system ==
=== Framework of the quantum energy teleportation protocol ===
The QET process is considered over short time scales, such that the Hamiltonian of the spin chain system is approximately invariant with time. It is also assumed that local operations and classical communications (LOCC) for the spins can be repeated several times within a short time span. Alice and Bob share entangled spin states in the ground state $|g\rangle$ with correlation length $\ell$. Alice is located at site $n_A$ of the spin chain system and Bob is located at site $n_B$ of the spin chain system such that Alice and Bob are far away from each other, $|n_A - n_B| \gg 1$.

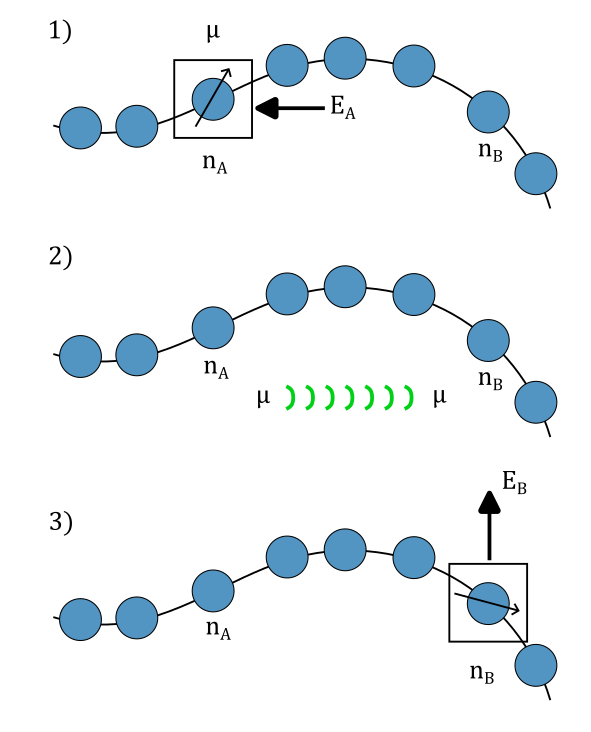
1) Alice first performs a local operation on her spin measuring an eigenvalue $\mu$. This process deposits energy into the spin chain $E_A$. 2) Alice classically communicates what her measurement result was to Bob. 3) Bob applies a specific local unitary based on Alice's measurement result to his spin. In this process, energy is released at Bob's spin.

=== The QET protocol ===
Conceptually, the QET protocol can be described by three steps:

1. Alice performs a local measurement on her spin at site $n_A$, measuring eigenvalue $\mu$. When Alice acts on her spin with the local operator, energy $E_A$ is inputted into the state.
2. Alice then communicates to Bob over a classical channel what her measurement result $\mu$ was. It is assumed that over the time the classical message is travelling that Alice and Bob's state does not evolve with time.
3. Based on the measurement Alice got on her spin $\mu$, Bob applies a specific local operator to his spin located at site $n_B$. After the application of the local operator, the expectation value of the Hamiltonian at this site $\hat{H}_{n_B}$ is negative. Since the expectation of $\hat{H}_{n_B}$ is zero before Bob's operation, the negative expectation value of $\hat{H}_{n_B}$ after the local operation implies energy was extracted at site $n_B$ while the operation was being applied.

Intuitively, one would not expect to be able to extract energy from the ground state in such a manner. However, this protocol allows energy to be teleported from Alice to Bob, despite Alice and Bob sharing entangled spin states in the ground state.

== Mathematical description ==
=== Local measurement by Alice ===
The QET protocol can be worked out mathematically. The derivation in this section follows the work done by Masahiro Hotta in "Quantum Energy Teleportation in Spin Chain Systems". Consider Alice's spin at site $n_A$ in a spin chain where each spin is entangled in ground state $|g\rangle$. For a Hermitian unitary local operator $\hat{\sigma}_A = \vec{u}_A \cdot \vec{\sigma}_{n_A}$, where $\vec{u}_A$ represents a 3D unit vector and $\vec{\sigma}_{n_A}$ is the Pauli spin matrix vector at site $n_A$, the eigenvalues are $(-1)^\mu$ with $\mu = 0,1$. Alice can perform a measurement on spin at site $n_A$ using this local operator to measures $\mu = 0 \text{ or } 1$. The expression for $\hat{\sigma}_A$ has spectral expansion $\hat{\sigma}_A = \sum_{\mu = 0, 1} (-1)^\mu \hat{P}_A(\mu)$ where $\hat{P}_A(\mu)$ is a projective operator which projects onto the eigensubspace with $\mu$. After Alice has made the measurement with the $\hat{\sigma}_A$ operator, the spin is left in the post-measurement state $\frac{1}{\sqrt{p_A(\mu)}} \hat{P}_A(\mu) |g\rangle$ where $p_A(\mu) = \langle g| \hat{P}_A(\mu) |g\rangle$. This is a mixed quantum state with density matrix:
$$\begin{align}
\hat{\rho}' &= \sum_{\mu=0,1}p_A(\mu)\frac{1}{\sqrt{p_A(\mu)}}\hat{P}_A(\mu)|g \rangle \langle g| \hat{P}_A(\mu) \frac{1}{\sqrt{p_A(\mu)}} \\
&= \hat{P}_A(\mu) |g \rangle \langle g| \hat{P}_A(\mu).
\end{align}$$
This density matrix satisfies the relation:

$\text{Tr}_{n_A}[\rho'] = \text{Tr}_{n_A}[|g\rangle \langle g|]$

which shows that the quantum fluctuation of $\rho'$ is the same as that of the ground state except at site $n_A$. This measurement requires Alice to input energy $E_A$ into the spin chain. Since the ground state has zero energy, $E_A$ is related by the difference in energy between the final quantum state $\rho'$ and the initial ground state $|g\rangle$:
$$E_A = \text{Tr} [\hat{\rho}' \hat{H}] - \langle g | \hat{H} | g \rangle = \sum_{\mu=0,1} \langle g | \hat{P}_A(\mu) \hat{H} \hat{P}_A(\mu) | g \rangle.$$
The energy Alice needs to input is non-negative since $\hat{H}$ is non-negative. $\hat{H}$ is shown to be non-negative in the source material. This is an important result of the measurement process as the point of the QET protocol is for Alice to inject a positive quantity of energy into the spin chain.

==== Emergence of negative energy density ====
The Hamiltonian for the spin chain system $\hat{H}$ can be expressed as the sum of the local energy operators $\hat{T_n}$ over all $n$ spins: $\hat{H} = \sum_n \hat{T}_n$. The local energy operators $\hat{T_n}$ can be shifted by adding constants such that the expectation value of the local energy operators are each zero, $\langle g | \hat{T}_n | g \rangle = 0$. Due to entanglement, the ground state $|g \rangle$ is not an eigenstate of $\hat{T_n}$. Since the expectation value of the local energy operators are zero, it implies that the lowest eigenvalue of $\hat{T_n}$ must be negative. The expectation value of $\hat{T_n}$ involves eigenstates of $\hat{T_n}$ with positive and negative energy densities, but will average to 0 across all eigenstates. Therefore, some of the spins in the spin chain that possess a negative energy density lead to spins possessing positive energy density to balance them out. This implies that energy can be withdrawn from certain spin sites with positive energy density, which is the process Bob will use to receive the teleported energy from Alice.

=== Classical communication between Alice and Bob ===
Alice then informs Bob of the value of the measurement $\mu$ over a classical channel. The time interval over which this information is transferred is considered to be very short such that the system does not evolve over this time and no emergence of energy flux occurs.

=== Application of a local unitary by Bob ===
Bob then applies the local unitary $\hat{U}_B(\mu)$ to the spin at site $n_B$ where $\hat{U}_B(\mu) = \hat{I} \text{cos} \theta + i (-1)^\mu \hat{\sigma}_B \text{sin} \theta$. Here $\hat{\sigma}_B = \vec{u}_B \cdot \vec{\sigma}_{n_B}$ where $\vec{u}_B$ is a 3D unit vector and $\vec{\sigma}_{n_B}$ is the Pauli spin matrix vector at site $n_B$. Two real coefficients are introduced $\xi = \langle g | \hat{\sigma}_B \hat{H} \hat{\sigma}_B | g \rangle$ and $\eta = \langle g | \hat{\sigma}_A \dot{\hat{\sigma}}_B | g \rangle$, where $\dot{\hat{\sigma}}_B = i [\hat{H}_{n_B}, \hat{\sigma}_B]$, which can be used to define the real angle parameter $\theta$ by $\text{cos} (2 \theta) = \frac{\xi}{\sqrt{\xi^2 + \eta^2}}$ and $\text{sin} (2 \theta) = -\frac{\eta}{\sqrt{\xi^2 + \eta^2}}$. Using $[\hat{T}_n, \hat{\sigma}_B] = 0$ for $|n - n_B| > L$, $\dot{\hat{\sigma}}_B$ can be expressed as $\dot{\hat{\sigma}}_B = i[\hat{H}, \hat{\sigma}_B]$. $\hat{T_n}$ refers to the local energy at site $n$.

The full derivation can be found in the source material. Essentially, Bob's application of the local unitary $\hat{U}_B(\mu)$ leaves his state in the quantum state $\hat{\rho}$. By using the relations for $\theta$ and other simplifications, the expectation value of the energy at site $n_B$ can be expressed as $\text{Tr} [\hat{\rho} \hat{H}_{n_B}]$ or
$$\text{Tr}[\hat{\rho} \hat{H}_{n_B}] = \frac{1}{2} \left[ \xi - \sqrt{\xi^2 + \eta^2} \right].$$
If $\eta \neq 0$ then $\text{Tr} [\hat{\rho} \hat{H}_{n_B}]$ becomes negative. Before Bob acts with the local unitary $\hat{U}_B(\mu)$, the energy around Bob is zero: $\text{Tr}[\hat{\rho}' \hat{H}_{n_B}] = 0$. This implies that some positive energy $E_B$ must be emitted from the spin chain as from the local energy conservation around site $n_B$: $E_B + \text{Tr}[\hat{\rho} \hat{H}_{n_B}] = \text{Tr}[\hat{\rho}' \hat{H}_{n_B}] = 0$. Which then follows that:
$$\begin{align}
E_B &= \text{Tr}[\hat{\rho}' \hat{H}_{n_B}] - \text{Tr}[\hat{\rho} \hat{H}_{n_B}] \\
&= \frac{1}{2} \left[ \sqrt{\xi^2 + \eta^2} - \xi \right].
\end{align}$$
So some positive quantity of energy $E_B$ has been extracted from site $n_B$, completing the QET protocol.

=== Constraints ===
==== Entanglement of the spin chain system ====
One of the constraints on the protocol is that Alice and Bob must share an entangled state. This can be proved mathematically. If the ground state is separable and can be expressed as $|g \rangle = |g \rangle_A \otimes |g \rangle_B$ and the relations $\dot{\hat{\sigma}}_B = i[H, \hat{\sigma}_B]$ and $\hat{H} |g \rangle = 0$ are used then it follows that:
$$\begin{align}
\eta &= \langle g | \hat{\sigma}_A \dot{\hat{\sigma}}_B |g \rangle = \langle g | \hat{\sigma}_A |g \rangle \langle g |\dot{\hat{\sigma}}_B |g \rangle \\
&=i\langle g | \hat{\sigma}_A |g \rangle \langle g | (\hat{H} \hat{\sigma}_B - \hat{\sigma}_B \hat{H}) |g \rangle = 0.
\end{align}$$
Therefore, Alice and Bob must share an entangled state for energy to be transported from Alice to Bob otherwise $\eta$ vanishes which causes $E_B$ to vanish.

==== Zero-cost energy ====
One could postulate that Alice could withdraw the energy she puts into the system when measuring $\hat{\sigma}_A$, $E_A$, thus making the energy Bob extracts, $E_B$, have zero-cost. Mathematically, this is not possible. First, when Alice measures $\hat{\sigma}_A$ at site $n_A$ the entanglement between the spin at site $n_A$ and the rest of the chain is broken since Alice has collapsed the local state. So, for Alice to extract the energy she first deposited to the system during the measurement process she must first restore the ground state. This implies that Alice would have to recreate the entanglement between the spin at site $n_A$ and the rest of the chain which is not possible with only local operators. To recreate the entanglement, Alice would need to use non-local operators which inherently require energy. Therefore, it is impossible for Alice to extract the energy $E_A$ while only using local operators.

== Quantum energy distribution ==
Quantum energy distribution (QED) is a protocol proposed by Masahiro Hotta in "A Protocol for Quantum Energy Distribution" which proposes an extension of QET with quantum key distribution (QKD). This protocol allows an energy supplier $S$ to distribute energy to $M$ consumers denoted by $C_m$.

=== Quantum energy distribution protocol ===
The supplier $S$ and any consumer $C_m$ share common short keys $k$ which are used for identification. Using the short keys $k$, $S$ and $C_m$ can perform secure QKD which allows $S$ to send classical information to the consumers. It is assumed that $S$ and $C_m$ share a set of many spin states in the ground state $|g \rangle$. The protocol follows six steps:

1. $S$ performs a local measurement of the observable $\hat{U}_S = \sum_{\mu=0,1} (-1)^\mu \hat{P}_S(\mu)$ on the ground state $|g \rangle$ and measures $\mu$. $S$ must input energy $E_S = \sum_{\mu=0,1} \langle g | \hat{P}_S(\mu) \hat{H} \hat{P}_S(\mu) | g \rangle$ into the spin chain.
2. $S$ confirms the identity of $C_m$ through use of the shared secret short keys $k$.
3. $S$ and $C_m$ share pseudo-random secret keys $K$ by use of a QKD protocol.
4. $S$ encodes the measurement result $\mu$ using secret key $K$ and sends it to $C_m$.
5. $C_m$ decodes the measurement result $\mu$ using secret key $K$.
6. $C_m$ performs the local unitary operation $\hat{V}_m(\mu)$ to their spin. $C_m$ receives energy $E_m = \frac{1}{2} \left[ \sqrt{\xi_m^2 + \eta_m^2} - \xi_m \right]$ where $\xi_m = \langle g| \hat{U}^\dagger_m \hat{H} \hat{U}_m |g \rangle$, $\eta_m = \langle g| \hat{U}_s \dot{\hat{U}}_m |g \rangle$, $\hat{U}_m = \vec{n}_m \cdot \vec{\sigma}_{n_{C_{m}}}$, $\dot{\hat{U}}_m = i [\hat{H}_{C_{m}}, \hat{U}_m]$, $\vec{n}_m$ is a unit vector, and $\vec{\sigma}_{n_{C_{m}}}$ is the Pauli spin matrix vector at site $n_{C_{m}}$.

=== Robustness against thieves ===
This process is robust against an unidentified consumer, a thief $D$, at site $n_D$ attempting to steal energy from the spin chain. After step 6, the post-measurement state is given by
$$\hat{\rho} = \sum_{\mu=0,1} \left( \prod_m \hat{U}_m(\mu) \right) \hat{P}_S(\mu) |g \rangle \langle g| \hat{P}_S(\mu) \left( \prod_m \hat{U}^\dagger_m(\mu) \right).$$
Since $D$ has no information on $\mu$ and therefore randomly acts with either $\hat{U}_D(0)$ or $\hat{U}_D(1)$ where $\hat{U}_D(\mu) = \hat{I} \text{cos} \theta + i (-1)^\mu \vec{n}_D \cdot \vec{\sigma}_{n_{D}}\text{sin} \theta$. The post-measurement state becomes a sum over the possible guesses D makes of $\mu$, 0 or 1. Taking the expectation value of the localized energy operator $\hat{H}_D$ yields:

$$\text{Tr}[\hat{\rho}_D \hat{H}_D] = \frac{1}{2} \sum_{\mu=0,1} \langle g|\hat{P}_S(\mu) \left( \prod_m \hat{U}^\dagger_m(\mu) \right) \hat{U}^\dagger_D(\mu) \hat{H}_D \hat{U}_D(\mu) \left( \prod_m \hat{U}_m(\mu) \right) \hat{P}_S(\mu) |g \rangle.$$
$\hat{H}_D$ is positive semi-definite by definition. This means that all expectation values of $\hat{H}_D$, even the ones altered by $\hat{U}_D(\mu)$, are greater than or equal to zero. At least one of the values in the sum of the trace will be positive, the one where $D$ guesses the wrong value of $\mu$. This is because the operation $\hat{U}_D(\mu)|g\rangle$ will add energy to the system when $\mu$ does not match the value measured by Alice. Therefore, $\text{Tr}[\hat{\rho}_D \hat{H}_D] > 0$ which implies that on average $D$ will have to input energy to the spin chains without gain.

This protocol is not perfect as theoretically $D$ could guess $\mu$ on their first attempt, which would be a 50% chance to guess $\mu$ correctly, and would immediately profit energy. However, the idea is that over multiple attempts $D$ will lose energy since the energy output from a correct guess is lower than that of the energy input required when making an incorrect guess.

== Experimental implementation ==
QET was experimentally demonstrated in 2022 by IQC group in the publication "Experimental Activation of Strong Local Passive States with Quantum Information", and in 2023 by Kazuki Ikeda in the publication "Demonstration of Quantum Energy Teleportation on Superconducting Quantum Hardware". The basic QET protocol discussed early was verified using several IBM superconducting quantum computers. Some of the quantum computers that were used include ibmq_lima, and ibm_cairo, and ibmq_jakarta which provided the most accurate results for the experiment. These quantum computers provide two connected qubits with high precision for controlled gate operation. The Hamiltonian used accounted for interactions between the two qubits using the $\hat{X}$ and $\hat{Z}$ Pauli operators.

=== Protocol ===
The entangled ground state was first prepared using the $\widehat{\text{CNOT}}$ and $\hat{R}_Y$ quantum gates. Alice then measured her state using the Pauli operator $\hat{X}$, injecting energy $E_0$ into the system. Alice then told Bob her measurement result over a classical channel. The classical communication of measurement results was on the order of 10 nanoseconds and was much faster than the energy propagation timescale of the system. Bob then applied a conditional rotational operation on his qubit dependent on Alice's measurement. Bob then performed a local measurement on his state to extract energy from the system $E_1$.

=== Results ===
The observed experimental values are dimensionless and the energy values correspond to the eigenvalues of the Hamiltonian. For quantum computers, energy scales tend to be limited by the qubit transition frequency which is often on the order of GHz. Therefore, the typical energy scale is on the order of $10^{-24}$ Joules. Ikeda experimented with varying the parameters in the Hamiltonian, specifically the local energy $h$ and interaction strength $k$, to see if the QET protocol improved under certain conditions.

For differing experimental parameters, the experimental values for Alice's input energy $E_0$ was around 1 and matched the experimental results very closely when error mitigation was applied. Bob's extracted energy $E_1$, for certain experimental parameters, was observed to be negative when error mitigation was applied. This indicates that the QET protocol was successful for certain experimental parameters. Depending on the experimental parameters, Bob would receive around 1-5% of Alice's inputted energy.

=== Quantum error correction ===
Quantum computers are currently the most viable platform for experimentally realizing QET. This is mainly due to their ability to implement quantum error correction. Quantum error correction is important specifically for implementing QET protocols experimentally due to the high precision needed to calculate the negative energy Bob receives in the QET protocol. Error correction in this experiment greatly improved the amount of energy Bob could extract from the system. In some cases without error correction, Bob's extracted energy would be positive, indicating the QET protocol did not work. However, after error correction, these values could be brought closer to the experimental values and in some cases even become negative, causing the QET protocol to function. The quantum error correction employed in this experiment allowed Ikeda to observe negative expectation values of the extracted energy $E_1$, which had not been experimentally observed before. High precision is also required for experimental implementation of QET due to the subtle effects of negative energy density. Since negative energy densities are a consequence of vacuum fluctuations, they can easily be overshadowed by measurement noise in the instrumentation. So, higher precision can lead to better distinguishability between negative energy signals and noise.

== See also ==
- Quantum teleportation
- Quantum entanglement
- Spin chains
- Quantum key distribution
- Quantum information science
