= Kaup =

Kaup may refer to:

- Kapu, Karnataka (AKA Kaup), a village in Udupi district, Karnataka, India
- Kaup (emporium), an early medieval trade settlement in the Curonian Lagoon
- Heinrich Kaup (1912–1999), highly decorated Feldwebel in the Wehrmacht during World War II
- Johann Jakob Kaup (1803–1873), German naturalist
- Kaup–Kupershmidt equation, the nonlinear fifth-order partial differential equation
