= Noncommutative projective geometry =

In mathematics, noncommutative projective geometry is a noncommutative analog of projective geometry in the setting of noncommutative algebraic geometry.

== Examples ==
- The quantum plane, the most basic example, is the quotient ring of the free ring:

$$k \langle x, y \rangle / (yx - q xy)$$

- More generally, the quantum polynomial ring is the quotient ring:

$$k \langle x_1, \dots, x_n \rangle / (x_i x_j - q_{ij} x_j x_i)$$

== Proj construction ==
By definition, the Proj of a graded ring R is the quotient category of the category of finitely generated graded modules over R by the subcategory of torsion modules. If R is a commutative Noetherian graded ring generated by degree-one elements, then the Proj of R in this sense is equivalent to the category of coherent sheaves on the usual Proj of R. Hence, the construction can be thought of as a generalization of the Proj construction for a commutative graded ring.

== See also ==
- Elliptic algebra
- Calabi–Yau algebra
- Sklyanin algebra
