= Haldane–Shastry model =

Statistical lattice model with long-range interactions

In quantum statistical physics, the Haldane–Shastry model is a spin chain, defined on a one-dimensional, periodic lattice. Unlike the prototypical Heisenberg spin chain, which only includes interactions between neighboring sites of the lattice, the Haldane–Shastry model has long-range interactions, that is, interactions between any pair of sites, regardless of the distance between them.

The model is named after and was defined independently by Duncan Haldane and B. Sriram Shastry. It is an exactly solvable model, and was exactly solved by Shastry.

== Formulation ==
For a chain with $L$ spin 1/2 sites, the quantum phase space is described by the Hilbert space $\mathcal{H} = (\mathbb{C}^2)^{\otimes L}$. The Haldane–Shastry model is described by the Hamiltonian
$$H = \sum_{i<j}^L \frac{1}{\sin^2[\tfrac{\pi}{L}(i-j)]} \, \frac{1 - \vec \sigma_i \cdot \vec \sigma_j}{2} \, ,$$
where $\vec{\sigma}_j$ denotes the Pauli vector at the $j$th site (acting nontrivially on the $j$th copy of $\mathbb{C}^2$ in $\mathcal{H}$). Note that the pair potential suppressing the interaction strength at longer distances is an inverse square $1/r^2$, with $r = |\sin[\tfrac{\pi}{L}(i-j)]|$ the chord distance between the $i$ and $j$th sites viewed as being equispaced on the unit circle.

== See also ==
- Inozemtsev model
