= Tonks–Girardeau gas =

Physics model of a 1D gas of bosons

In physics, a Tonks–Girardeau gas is a Bose gas in which the repulsive interactions between bosonic particles confined to one dimension dominate the system's physics. It is named after physicists Lewi Tonks, who developed a classical model in 1936, and Marvin D. Girardeau who generalized it to the quantum regime. It is not a Bose–Einstein condensate as it does not demonstrate any of the necessary characteristics, such as off-diagonal long-range order or a unitary two-body correlation function, even in a thermodynamic limit and as such cannot be described by a macroscopically occupied orbital (order parameter) in the Gross–Pitaevskii formulation.

The Tonks–Girardeau gas is a particular case of the Lieb–Liniger model.

== Definition ==
A row of bosons all confined to a one-dimensional line cannot pass each other and therefore cannot exchange places. The resulting motion has been compared to a traffic jam: the motion of each boson is strongly correlated with that of its two neighbors. This can be thought of as the large-c limit of the delta Bose gas.

Because the particles cannot exchange places, their behavior might be expected to be fermionic, but their behavior differs from that of fermions in several important ways: the particles can all occupy the same momentum state, which corresponds to neither Bose-Einstein nor Fermi–Dirac statistics. This is the phenomenon of bosonization which happens in 1+1 dimensions.

In the case of a Tonks–Girardeau gas (TG), so many properties of this one-dimensional string of bosons would be sufficiently fermion-like that the situation is often referred to as the 'fermionization' of bosons. Tonks–Girardeau gas matches quantum Nonlinear Schrödinger equation for infinite repulsion, which can be efficiently analyzed by quantum inverse scattering method. This relation helps to study correlation functions. The correlation functions can be described by an Integrable system. In a simple case, it is a Painlevé transcendent. The quantum correlation functions of a Tonks–Girardeau gas can be described by means of classical, completely integrable, differential equations. Thermodynamics of Tonks–Girardeau gas was described by Chen Ning Yang.

== Physical realization ==
The first example of TGs came in 2004 when Paredes and coworkers created an array of such gases using an optical lattice. In a different experiment, Kinoshita and coworkers observed a strongly correlated 1D Tonks–Girardeau gas.

The optical lattice is formed by six intersecting laser beams, which generate an interference pattern. The beams are arranged as standing waves along three orthogonal directions. This results in an array of optical dipole traps where atoms are stored in the intensity maxima of the interference pattern.

The researchers loaded ultracold rubidium atoms into one-dimensional tubes formed by a two-dimensional lattice (the third standing wave is initially off). This lattice is strong so that the atoms have insufficient energy to tunnel between neighboring tubes. The interaction is too low for the transition to the TG regime. For that, the third axis of the lattice is used. It is set to a lower intensity and shorter time than the other two, so that tunneling in this direction is possible. For increasing intensity of the third lattice, atoms in the same lattice well are more and more tightly trapped, which increases the collisional energy. When the collisional energy becomes much bigger than the tunneling energy, the atoms can still tunnel into empty lattice wells, but not into or across occupied ones.

This technique has been used by other researchers to obtain an array of one-dimensional Bose gases in the Tonks-Girardeau regime. However, the fact that an array of gases is observed only allows the measurement of averaged quantities. Moreover, the temperatures and chemical potential between the different tubes are dispersed, which wash out many effects. For instance, this configuration does not allow probing of system fluctuations. Thus it proved interesting to produce a single Tonks–Girardeau gas. In 2011 one team created a single one-dimensional TG gas by trapping rubidium atoms magnetically in the vicinity of a microstructure. Thibaut Jacqmin et al. measured density fluctuations in that single strongly interacting gas. Those fluctuations proved to be sub-Poissonian, as expected for a Fermi gas.

== See also ==
- BCS theory
- Quantum mechanics
- Super Tonks–Girardeau gas
