= ODE/IM correspondence =

Link between differential equations and integrable systems

In mathematical physics, the ODE/IM correspondence is a link between ordinary differential equations (ODEs) and integrable models. It was first found in 1998 by Patrick Dorey and Roberto Tateo. In this original setting it relates the spectrum of a certain integrable model of magnetism known as the XXZ-model to solutions of the one-dimensional Schrödinger equation with a specific choice of potential, where the position coordinate is considered as a complex coordinate.

Since then, such a correspondence has been found for many more ODE/IM pairs.

== See also ==
- Bethe ansatz
- WKB approximation
