= Integrable algorithm =

Numerical algorithms based on integrable systems

Integrable algorithms are numerical algorithms that rely on basic ideas from the mathematical theory of integrable systems.

== Background ==
The theory of integrable systems has advanced with the connection between numerical analysis. For example, the discovery of solitons came from the numerical experiments to the KdV equation by Norman Zabusky and Martin David Kruskal. Today, various relations between numerical analysis and integrable systems have been found (Toda lattice and numerical linear algebra, discrete soliton equations and series acceleration), and studies to apply integrable systems to numerical computation are rapidly advancing.

== Integrable difference schemes ==
Generally, it is hard to accurately compute the solutions of nonlinear differential equations due to its non-linearity. In order to overcome this difficulty, R. Hirota has made discrete versions of integrable systems with the viewpoint of "Preserve mathematical structures of integrable systems in the discrete versions".

At the same time, Mark J. Ablowitz and others have not only made discrete soliton equations with discrete Lax pair but also compared numerical results between integrable difference schemes and ordinary methods. As a result of their experiments, they have found that the accuracy can be improved with integrable difference schemes at some cases.

== See also ==
- Soliton
- Integrable system
