= Anti-integrability =

Method of studying dynamical systems

Anti-integrability is a method used to study the chaotic bounds of a dynamical system. A dynamical system is at the anti-integrable limit if it becomes singular and trajectories of the dynamical system no longer have an explicit form. In other words, the system becomes non-deterministic and reduces to an implicit relation with multiple solutions. The significance of this limit is that, under some conditions, trajectories at the anti-integrable limit, referred to as anti-integrable states, can persist onto trajectories of the original dynamical system. Thus, anti-integrability provides a way to rigorously prove the existence of chaotic orbits and to study perturbations of a dynamical system.

== Statement ==
The term anti-integrability was formalized in 1990 in the field of solid state physics by Aubry and Abramovici as a method that 'opposed' integrability. It was first defined in the context of discrete Lagrangian systems, or (locally) symplectic maps.

Trajectories of a discrete symplectic system, $\{x_t\}$ for $t\in\mathbb{Z}$, can be found via the principle of least action. The action of a trajectory, $S(\{x_t\})$, can be written as a sum of discrete Lagrangians $L(x_t,x_{t+1})$, which are combinations of kinetic $K(x_t-x_{t+1})$ and potential $V(x_t)$ energies,

$S(\{x_t\})=\sum_tL(x_t,x_{t+1})=\sum_t \left( K(x_t-x_{t+1})-V(x_t) \right)$.

=== Definition for discrete Lagrangian systems ===
According to Aubry and Abramovici, a symplectic dynamical system with trajectories $\{x_t\}$ and discrete time $t\in\mathbb{Z}$ is anti-integrable when its action (or generating function) $\sum_tL(x_{t},x_{t+1})$ can be written as $\sum_tV(x_t)$.

The dynamics of the map governing $x_t\mapsto x_{t+1}$ are considered integrable when the potential energy vanishes, and solutions can be found via the law of conservation of momentum. In contrast, the anti-integrable limit can be interpreted as the kinetic energy vanishing. Following the principle of least action, trajectories of the map at the anti-integrable limit must lie at critical points of the potential energy and the 'dynamics' become non-deterministic, reducing to the shift operator acting on the set of these critical points. Trajectories at this limit, referred to as anti-integrable states, can then be analytically or numerically continued toward integrability. This process is similar to perturbing an integrable system via KAM theory. KAM theory is used to find regular solutions that persist away from integrability, when more and more solutions become irregular. In contrast, the theory of anti-integrability is used to find irregular solutions that persist away from the anti-integrable limit, when more and more solutions become regular.

==== Example: Standard map ====
Written as a single difference equation, the standard map is given as

$x_{t+1}-2x_t+x_{t-1}=\lambda\sin{x_t}$,

for $x_t\in\mathbb{R}$ modulo $2\pi$ and $\lambda>0$. The Lagrangian of this difference equation takes the form

$L(x_t,x_{t+1})= K(x_t-x_{t+1})-V(x_t)=(x_t-x_{t+1})^2-2\lambda\cos{x_t}.$

In accordance with the principle of least action, trajectories of the standard map lie at the critical points of the sum of Lagrangians, i.e., where

$\frac{\partial}{\partial x_n}\sum_tL(x_t,x_{t+1})=0$

for any $n\in\mathbb{Z}$. This condition on the Lagrangian above reproduces the standard map.

The anti-integrable limit of the standard map is the limit $\lambda\to\infty$. To find this limit, we rescale the parameter as $\lambda=\frac{1}{\epsilon}$ so that it becomes

$\epsilon(x_{t+1}-2x_t+x_{t-1})=\sin{x_t}.$

The corresponding Lagrangian is now

$L(x_t,x_{t+1})=\epsilon(x_t-x_{t+1})^2-2\cos{x_t}$.

With this rescaling, the anti-integrable limit is now the limit $\epsilon\to0$. Applying this limit and the principle of least action leads to the non-deterministic, implicit relation

$\sin{x_t}=0,$

with solutions $m\pi$ for integer $m$. Valid anti-integrable states then come in the form

$\{\ldots, m_{-1}\pi, m_0\pi, m_1\pi, \ldots\} \quad \text{for} \quad m_n\in\mathbb{Z},$

and the dynamics reduce to the shift operator on these states.

Arguments using the implicit function theorem and contraction mapping theorem can then be made to show that anti-integrable states can persist for small $\epsilon>0$, as discussed in Aubry and Abramovici's formative work.

The definition above was generalized by Aubry in 1995 to include all discrete maps. This generalized definition provides an alternative, and arguably easier, approach to implement anti-integrability, as can be seen in the example of the logistic map below.

=== Definition for general discrete maps ===
Consider a one parameter $\epsilon$-continuous family of deterministic dynamical systems $X_{t+1}=F_\epsilon(X_t)$. The limit $\epsilon\to0$ is called the anti-integrable limit when

- The system can be defined as an implicit dynamical system, i.e., there exists a function $G_\epsilon(X,Y)$ which depends continuously on $\epsilon$ such that the implicit equation $G_\epsilon(X,Y)=0$ is equivalent to $Y=F_\epsilon(X)$ for $\epsilon\neq0$ and such that the limit $G_0(X,Y)$ is defined.
- The solutions $\{X_t\}$ of the implicit equations $G_0(X_{t+1},X_t)=0$ for all $t$ form a discrete set which can be characterized by an infinite sequence $\{s_t\}\in\Sigma^\mathbb{Z}$ called a coding (or symbolic) sequence $\{s_t\}\to\{X_t\}$ where $s_t$ belongs to a discrete set $\Sigma$ of codes (or symbols).

==== Example: Logistic map ====
Following the work of Chen, the logistic map,

$x_{t+1}= \mu x_t(1-x_t), \quad x\in\mathbb{R}, \quad\mu>0,$

has an anti-integrable limit $\mu\to\infty$. To see this, rewrite the map using the rescaling $\mu=\frac{1}{\epsilon}$ to obtain

$x_t(1-x_t)=\epsilon x_{t+1}.$

The singular anti-integrable limit $\mu\to\infty$ now corresponds with $\epsilon\to 0$.

When $\epsilon=0$, the map becomes the non-deterministic, implicit relation $x_t(1-x_t)=0$ and has the solutions $x_t=0$ or $x_t=1$ for every $t\in\mathbb{Z}$. Each valid anti-integrable state is associated with a symbolic sequence, $s=\{\ldots, s_{-1},s_0,s_1,\ldots\}$, where $s_t\in\{0,1\},$ for integer $t$. Thus, at the anti-integrable limit, the 'dynamics' become a shift on these two symbols.

The anti-integrable states at $\epsilon=0$ persist for small $\epsilon>0$, which Chen proves analytically with an implicit function theorem argument.

== Extensions ==
Arguments for persistence away from the anti-integrable limit typically utilize the implicit function theorem or the contraction mapping theorem. One can also continue anti-integrable states away from the anti-integrable limit using numerical continuation.

Anti-integrability has also been used to prove the existence of a horseshoe and to study the development of chaotic attractors over changing parameters.
