= Spin chain =

Type of model in quantum statistical physics

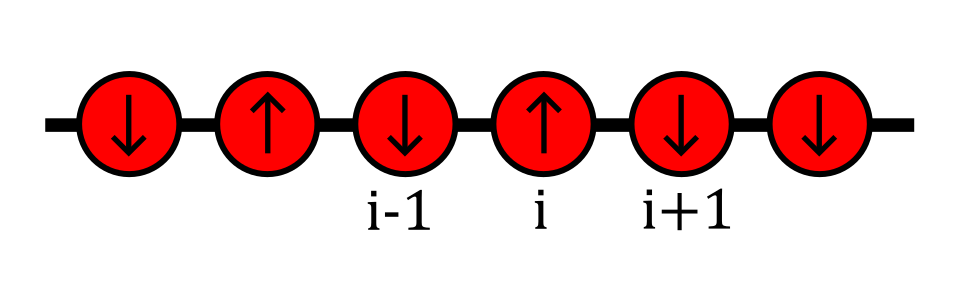
A simplified illustration of the spin chain model. The spin of the ith site can interact with the spins from the i - 1 and i + 1 sites.

A spin chain is a type of model in statistical physics. Spin chains were originally formulated to model magnetic systems, which typically consist of particles with magnetic spin located at fixed sites on a lattice. A prototypical example is the quantum Heisenberg model. Interactions between the sites are modelled by operators which act on two different sites, often neighboring sites.

They can be seen as a quantum version of statistical lattice models, such as the Ising model, in the sense that the parameter describing the spin at each site is promoted from a variable taking values in a discrete set (typically $\{+1, -1\}$, representing 'spin up' and 'spin down') to a variable taking values in a vector space (typically the spin-1/2 or two-dimensional representation of $\mathfrak{su}(2)$).

== History ==
The prototypical example of a spin chain is the Heisenberg model, described by Werner Heisenberg in 1928. This models a one-dimensional lattice of fixed particles with spin 1/2. A simple version (the antiferromagnetic XXX model) was solved, that is, the spectrum of the Hamiltonian of the Heisenberg model was determined, by Hans Bethe using the Bethe ansatz. Now the term Bethe ansatz is used generally to refer to many ansatzes used to solve exactly solvable problems in spin chain theory such as for the other variations of the Heisenberg model (XXZ, XYZ), and even in statistical lattice theory, such as for the six-vertex model.

Another spin chain with physical applications is the Hubbard model, introduced by John Hubbard in 1963. This model was shown to be exactly solvable by Elliott Lieb and Fa-Yueh Wu in 1968.

Another example of (a class of) spin chains is the Gaudin model, described and solved by Michel Gaudin in 1976

== Mathematical description ==
The lattice is described by a graph $G$ with vertex set $V$ and edge set $E$.

The model has an associated Lie algebra $\mathfrak{sl}_2 := \mathfrak{sl}(2, \mathbb{C})$. More generally, this Lie algebra can be taken to be any complex, finite-dimensional semi-simple Lie algebra $\mathfrak{g}$. More generally still it can be taken to be an arbitrary Lie algebra.

Each vertex $v \in V$ has an associated representation of the Lie algebra $\mathfrak{g}$, labelled $V_v$. This is a quantum generalization of statistical lattice models, where each vertex has an associated 'spin variable'.

The Hilbert space $\mathcal{H}$ for the whole system, which could be called the state space, is the tensor product of the representation spaces at each vertex:
$$\mathcal{H} = \bigotimes_{v\in V} V_v.$$

A Hamiltonian is then an operator on the Hilbert space. In the theory of spin chains, there are possibly many Hamiltonians which mutually commute. This allows the operators to be simultaneously diagonalized.

There is a notion of exact solvability for spin chains, often stated as determining the spectrum of the model. In precise terms, this means determining the simultaneous eigenvectors of the Hilbert space for the Hamiltonians of the system as well as the eigenvalues of each eigenvector with respect to each Hamiltonian.

== Examples ==
=== Spin 1/2 XXX model in detail ===
The prototypical example, and a particular example of the Heisenberg spin chain, is known as the spin 1/2 Heisenberg XXX model.

The graph $G$ is the periodic 1-dimensional lattice with $N$-sites. Explicitly, this is given by $V = \{1, \cdots, N\}$, and the elements of $E$ being $\{n, n+1\}$ with $N+1$ identified with $1$.

The associated Lie algebra is $\mathfrak{sl}_2$.

At site $n$ there is an associated Hilbert space $h_n$ which is isomorphic to the two dimensional representation of $\mathfrak{sl}_2$ (and therefore further isomorphic to $\mathbb{C}^2$). The Hilbert space of system configurations is $\mathcal{H} = \bigotimes_{n = 1}^N h_n$, of dimension $2^N$.

Given an operator $A$ on the two-dimensional representation $h$ of $\mathfrak{sl}_2$, denote by $A^{(n)}$ the operator on $\mathcal{H}$ which acts as $A$ on $h_n$ and as identity on the other $h_m$ with $m \neq n$. Explicitly, it can be written
$$A^{(n)} = 1\otimes \cdots \otimes \underbrace{A}_{n} \otimes \cdots \otimes 1,$$
where the 1 denotes identity.

The Hamiltonian is essentially, up to an affine transformation, $H = \sum_{n = 1}^N \sigma^{(n)}_i \sigma^{(n+1)}_i$ with implied summation over index $i$, and where $\sigma_i$ are the Pauli matrices. The Hamiltonian has $\mathfrak{sl}_2$ symmetry under the action of the three total spin operators $\sigma_i = \sum_{n = 1}^{N} \sigma_i^{(n)}$.

The central problem is then to determine the spectrum (eigenvalues and eigenvectors in $\mathcal{H}$) of the Hamiltonian. This is solved by the method of an Algebraic Bethe ansatz, discovered by Hans Bethe and further explored by Ludwig Faddeev.

=== List of spin chains ===
- Quantum Heisenberg model
- Inozemtsev model
- Haldane–Shastry model
- Quantum Gaudin model
- Transverse-field Ising model

== See also ==
- Lattice model (physics)
- Exactly solvable
