= Oper (mathematics) =

Principal connection

In mathematics, an oper is a principal connection, or in more elementary terms a type of differential operator. They were first defined and used by Vladimir Drinfeld and Vladimir Sokolov to study how the KdV equation and related integrable PDEs correspond to algebraic structures known as Kac–Moody algebras. Their modern formulation is due to Drinfeld and Alexander Beilinson.

== History ==
Opers were first defined, although not named, in a 1981 Russian paper by Drinfeld and Sokolov on Equations of Korteweg–de Vries type, and simple Lie algebras. They were later generalized by Drinfeld and Beilinson in 1993, later published as an e-print in 2005.

== Formulation ==
=== Abstract ===
Let $G$ be a connected reductive group over the complex plane $\mathbb{C}$, with a distinguished Borel subgroup $B = B_G \subset G$. Set $N = [B,B]$, so that $H = B/N$ is the Cartan group.

Denote by $\mathfrak{n} < \mathfrak{b} < \mathfrak{g}$ and $\mathfrak{h} = \mathfrak{b}/\mathfrak{n}$ the corresponding Lie algebras. There is an open $B$-orbit $\mathbf{O}$ consisting of vectors stabilized by the radical $N\subset B$ such that all of their negative simple-root components are non-zero.

Let $X$ be a smooth curve.

A G-oper on $X$ is a triple $(\mathfrak{F}, \nabla, \mathfrak{F}_B)$ where $\mathfrak{F}$ is a principal $G$-bundle, $\nabla$ is a connection on $\mathfrak{F}$ and $\mathfrak{F}_B$ is a $B$-reduction of $\mathfrak{F}$, such that the one-form $\nabla/\mathfrak{F}_B$ takes values in $\mathbf{O}_{\mathfrak{F}_B}$.

== Example ==
Fix $X = \mathbb{P}^1 = \mathbb{CP}^1$ the Riemann sphere. Working at the level of the algebras, fix $\mathfrak{g} = \mathfrak{sl}(2, \mathbb{C})$, which can be identified with the space of traceless $2\times 2$ complex matrices. Since $\mathbb{P}^1$ has only one (complex) dimension, a one-form has only one component, and so an $\mathfrak{sl}(2,\mathbb{C})$-valued one form is locally described by a matrix of functions
$$A(z) = \begin{pmatrix}a(z) & b(z) \\ c(z) & -a(z)\end{pmatrix}$$
where $a, b, c$ are allowed to be meromorphic functions.

Denote by $\text{Conn}_{\mathfrak{sl}(2,\mathbb{C})}(\mathbb{P}^1)$ the space of $\mathfrak{sl}(2,\mathbb{C})$ valued meromorphic functions together with an action by $g(z)$, meromorphic functions valued in the associated Lie group $G = SL(2, \mathbb{C})$. The action is by a formal gauge transformation:
$$g(z) * A(z) = g(z)A(z)g(z)^{-1} - g'(z) g(z)^{-1}.$$

Then opers are defined in terms of a subspace of these connections. Denote by $\text{op}_{\mathfrak{sl}(2,\mathbb{C})}(\mathbb{P}^1)$ the space of connections with $c(z) \equiv 1$. Denote by $N$ the subgroup of meromorphic functions valued in $SL(2, \mathbb{C})$ of the form
$$\begin{pmatrix} 1 & f(z) \\ 0 & 1 \end{pmatrix}$$
with $f(z)$ meromorphic.

Then for $g(z) \in N, A(z) \in \text{op}_{\mathfrak{sl}(2,\mathbb{C})}(\mathbb{P}^1),$ it holds that $g(z) * A(z) \in \text{op}_{\mathfrak{sl}(2,\mathbb{C})}(\mathbb{P}^1)$. It therefore defines an action. The orbits of this action concretely characterize opers. However, generally this description only holds locally and not necessarily globally.

== Gaudin model ==
Opers on $\mathbb{P}^1$ have been used by Boris Feigin, Edward Frenkel and Nicolai Reshetikhin to characterize the spectrum of the Gaudin model.

Specifically, for a $\mathfrak{g}$-Gaudin model, and defining $^L\mathfrak{g}$ as the Langlands dual algebra, there is a bijection between the spectrum of the Gaudin algebra generated by operators defined in the Gaudin model and an algebraic variety of $^L\mathfrak{g}$ opers.
