= Alexander Its =

Alexander R. Its is a Distinguished Professor of Mathematical Sciences at Indiana University-Purdue University Indianapolis. He completed his doctorate from Saint Petersburg State University, then known as Leningrad University, in 1977. Afterwards, he continued his career as a lecturer at the Steklov Institute in Saint Petersburg before becoming a professor at his alma mater. He remained there until 1993, when he assumed his current role at Indiana University. His research focuses on integrable systems, examining asymptotic analysis of matrix models using Riemann–Hilbert and isomonodromy methods, asymptotic analysis of correlation functions related to aspects of theoretical Fredholm and Toeplitz operators, and the theory of integrable nonlinear partial and ordinary differential equations of KdV and Painlevé types.

Awards received by Its over the course of his career include the Prize of the Moscow Mathematical Society (1976), the Prize of the Leningrad Mathematical Society (1981), the Hardy Fellowship of the London Mathematical Society (2002), the Batsheva de Rothschild Fellowship of the Israel Academy of Sciences and Humanities (2009), and Fellowship in the American Mathematical Society (2012). In 2012, a conference on "Integrable Systems and Random Matrices" was held in his honor at the Institut Henri Poincaré in Paris.
