= Ludvig Faddeev =

Russian mathematician and physicist (1934–2017)

- Людвиг Фаддеев
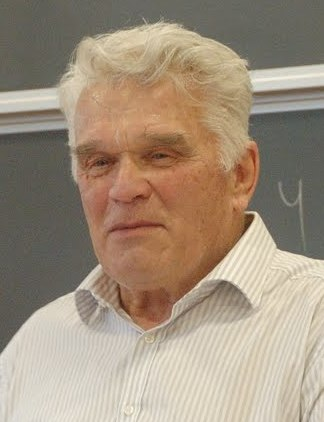
- Faddeev in 2010
- Born: 23 March 1934; Leningrad, Soviet Union
- Died: 26 February 2017 (aged 82)
- Education: Saint Petersburg State University
- Known for: Faddeev equations Faddeev–Popov ghosts Faddeev–Senjanovic quantization Faddeev–Jackiw quantization Quantum dilogarithm Quantum inverse scattering method Yangian
- Awards: Dannie Heineman Prize (1975); Dirac Prize (1990); Max Planck Medal (1996); Pomeranchuk Prize (2002); Demidov Prize (2002); Poincaré Prize (2006); Shaw Prize (2008); Lomonosov Gold Medal (2013)
- Scientific career
- Fields: Mathematics, theoretical physics
- Workplaces: Steklov Institute of Mathematics
- Doctoral advisor: Olga Ladyzhenskaya
- Doctoral students: Vladimir Buslaev; Nicolai Reshetikhin; Samson Shatashvili; Evgeny Sklyanin; Leon Takhtajan; Vladimir Korepin

Ludvig Dmitrievich Faddeev (also Ludwig Dmitriyevich; Russian: Лю́двиг Дми́триевич Фадде́ев; 23 March 1934 – 26 February 2017) was a Soviet and Russian mathematical physicist. He is known for the discovery of the Faddeev equations in the quantum-mechanical three-body problem and for the development of path-integral methods in the quantization of non-abelian gauge field theories, including the introduction of the Faddeev–Popov ghosts (with Victor Popov). He led the Leningrad School, in which he along with many of his students developed the quantum inverse scattering method for studying quantum integrable systems in one space and one time dimension. This work led to the invention of quantum groups by Drinfeld and Jimbo.

== Biography ==
Faddeev was born in Leningrad to a family of mathematicians. His father, Dmitry Faddeev, was a well-known algebraist, professor of Leningrad University and member of the Russian Academy of Sciences. His mother, Vera Faddeeva, was known for her work in numerical linear algebra. Faddeev attended Leningrad University, receiving his undergraduate degree in 1956. He enrolled in physics, rather than mathematics, "to be independent of [his] father". Nevertheless, he received a solid education in mathematics as well "due to the influence of V. A. Fock and V. I. Smirnov". His doctoral work on scattering theory was completed in 1959 under the direction of Olga Ladyzhenskaya.

From 1976 to 2000, Faddeev was head of the St. Petersburg Department of Steklov Institute of Mathematics of Russian Academy of Sciences (PDMI RAS). He was an invited visitor to the CERN Theory Division for the first time in 1973 and made several further visits there.

In 1988 he founded the Euler International Mathematical Institute, now a department of PDMI RAS.

== Honours and awards ==
Faddeev was a member of the Russian Academy of Sciences since 1976, and was a member of a number of foreign academies, including the U. S. National Academy of Sciences, the French Academy of Sciences, the Austrian Academy of Sciences, the Brazilian Academy of Sciences, the Royal Swedish Academy of Sciences and the Royal Society. He received numerous honors including USSR State Prize (1971), Dannie Heineman Prize (1975), Dirac Prize (1990), an honorary doctorate from the Faculty of Mathematics and Science at Uppsala University, Sweden, Max Planck Medal (1996), Demidov Prize (2002 – "For outstanding contribution to the development of mathematics, quantum mechanics, string theory and solitons") and the State Prize of the Russian Federation (1995, 2004). He was president of the International Mathematical Union (1986–1990). He was awarded the Henri Poincaré Prize in 2006 and the Shaw Prize in mathematical sciences in 2008. Also the Karpinsky International Prize and the Max Planck Medal (German Physical Society). He also received the Lomonosov Gold Medal in 2013.

Faddeev also received state awards:

- Order of Merit for the Fatherland;
  - 3rd class (25 October 2004) – for outstanding contribution to the development of fundamental and applied domestic science and many years of fruitful activity
  - 4th class (4 June 1999) – for outstanding contribution to the development of national science and training of highly qualified personnel in connection with the 275th anniversary of the Russian Academy of Sciences
- Order of Friendship (6 June 1994) – for his great personal contribution to the development of mathematical physics and training of highly qualified scientific personnel
- Order of Lenin
- Order of the Red Banner of Labour
- State Prize of the Russian Federation in Science and Technology 2004 (6 June 2005), for outstanding achievement in the development of mathematical physics and in 1995 for science and technology (20 June 1995), for the monograph "Introduction to quantum gauge field theory"
- USSR State Prize (1971)
- Honorary citizen of St. Petersburg (2010)
- Academician (Finland) (1991)

== Selected works ==
- Faddeev, L. D.; Slavnov, A. A. (2018), Gauge Fields: An Introduction to Quantum Theory (2nd ed.), CRC Press, doi:10.1201/9780429493829, ISBN 978-0-201-52472-7, S2CID 226468912; translated from the Russian by G. B. Pontecorvo; 1st edition 1991
- Faddeev, L. D. (1995), 40 years in Mathematical Physics, Vol. 2, World Scientific series in 20th century mathematics, World Scientific, ISBN 978-981-02-2199-7
- Faddeev, L. D. (1996), "How Algebraic Bethe Ansatz works for integrable model", arXiv:hep-th/9605187
- Faddeev, L. D. (2000), "Modern Mathematical Physics: what it should be?", arXiv:math-ph/0002018
- Faddeev, L. D. (2009), "New variables for the Einstein theory of gravitation", arXiv:0911.0282 [hep-th]
- Ge, Molin; Niemi, Antti J., eds. (2016), Fifty years in Mathematical Physics: Selected Works of Ludwig Faddeev, World Scientific series in 20th century mathematics – Vol. 2, World Scientific, ISBN 978-981-31-0933-9; 596 pages; pbk
