= Marvin D. Girardeau =

- Born: October 3, 1930
- Died: January 13, 2015 (aged 84)
- Known for: Tonks–Girardeau gas
- Awards: 1984 Humboldt Prize
- Scientific career
- Fields: Quantum physics
- Workplaces: Institute for Theoretical Science

Marvin D. Girardeau (3 October 1930 – 13 January 2015) was a quantum physicist, and a faculty member in the Institute for Theoretical Science at the University of Oregon, where he was hired as a professor in 1963 and worked until his retirement in 2000, after which he became a research professor at the University of Arizona. He was a mathematical physicist with an unusual nonlinear career, which culminated in a remarkable impact in the ultracold atom physics community. One of Girardeau's achievements was to predict the existence of the Tonks–Girardeau gas in 1960. A Tonks–Girardeau gas was created in 2004, and its measured properties strikingly confirmed Girardeau's original predictions.

His research interests included the dynamics of ultracold atomic vapour confined in tight de Broglie waveguides; and the behaviour of identical particles including fermions, bosons, and anyons.

Girardeau was a fellow of the American Physical Society, and winner of the 1984 Humboldt Prize. His 1984-86 tenure at the Max Planck Institut für Strahlenchemie, Mühlheim/Ruhr, Germany, followed. In 2013, Marvin was nominated for a prestigious Senior BEC Award by the European Community.
