= Sklyanin algebra =

In mathematics, specifically the field of algebra, Sklyanin algebras are a class of noncommutative algebra named after Evgeny Sklyanin. This class of algebras was first studied in the classification of Artin-Schelter regular algebras of global dimension 3 in the 1980s. Sklyanin algebras can be grouped into two different types, the non-degenerate Sklyanin algebras and the degenerate Sklyanin algebras, which have very different properties. A need to understand the non-degenerate Sklyanin algebras better has led to the development of the study of point modules in noncommutative geometry.

== Formal definition ==
Let $k$ be a field with a primitive cube root of unity. Let $\mathfrak{D}$ be the following subset of the projective plane $\textbf{P}_k^2$:

$\mathfrak{D} = \{ [1:0:0], [0:1:0], [0:0:1] \} \sqcup \{ [a:b:c ] \big| a^3=b^3=c^3\}.$

Each point $[a:b:c] \in \textbf{P}_k^2$ gives rise to a (quadratic 3-dimensional) Sklyanin algebra,

$S_{a,b,c} = k \langle x,y,z \rangle / (f_1, f_2, f_3),$

where,

$f_1 = ayz + bzy + cx^2, \quad f_2 = azx + bxz + cy^2, \quad f_3 = axy + b yx + cz^2.$

Whenever $[a:b:c ] \in \mathfrak{D}$ we call $S_{a,b,c}$ a degenerate Sklyanin algebra and whenever $[a:b:c] \in \textbf{P}^2 \setminus \mathfrak{D}$ we say the algebra is non-degenerate.

== Properties ==
The non-degenerate case shares many properties with the commutative polynomial ring $k[x,y,z]$, whereas the degenerate case enjoys almost none of these properties. Generally the non-degenerate Sklyanin algebras are more challenging to understand than their degenerate counterparts.

=== Properties of degenerate Sklyanin algebras ===
Let $S_{\text{deg}}$ be a degenerate Sklyanin algebra.

- $S_{\text{deg}}$ contains non-zero zero divisors.
- The Hilbert series of $S_{\text{deg}}$ is $H_{S_{\text{deg}}} = \frac{1+t}{1-2t}$.
- Degenerate Sklyanin algebras have infinite Gelfand–Kirillov dimension.
- $S_{\text{deg}}$ is neither left nor right Noetherian.
- $S_{\text{deg}}$ is a Koszul algebra.
- Degenerate Sklyanin algebras have infinite global dimension.

=== Properties of non-degenerate Sklyanin algebras ===
Let $S$ be a non-degenerate Sklyanin algebra.

- $S$ contains no non-zero zero divisors.
- The hilbert series of $S$ is $H_{S} = \frac{1}{(1-t)^3}$.
- Non-degenerate Sklyanin algebras are Noetherian.
- $S$ is Koszul.
- Non-degenerate Sklyanin algebras are Artin-Schelter regular. Therefore, they have global dimension 3 and Gelfand–Kirillov dimension 3.
- There exists a normal central element in every non-degenerate Sklyanin algebra.

== Examples ==
=== Degenerate Sklyanin algebras ===
The subset $\mathfrak{D}$ consists of 12 points on the projective plane, which give rise to 12 expressions of degenerate Sklyanin algebras. However, some of these are isomorphic and there exists a classification of degenerate Sklyanin algebras into two different cases. Let $S_{\text{deg}} = S_{a,b,c}$ be a degenerate Sklyanin algebra.

- If $a=b$ then $S_{\text{deg}}$ is isomorphic to $k \langle x,y,z \rangle /(x^2,y^2,z^2)$, which is the Sklyanin algebra corresponding to the point $[0:0:1] \in \mathfrak{D}$.
- If $a \neq b$ then $S_{\text{deg}}$ is isomorphic to $k \langle x,y,z \rangle /(xy,yx,zx)$, which is the Sklyanin algebra corresponding to the point $[1:0:0] \in \mathfrak{D}$.

These two cases are Zhang twists of each other and therefore have many properties in common.

=== Non-degenerate Sklyanin algebras ===
The commutative polynomial ring $k[x,y,z]$ is isomorphic to the non-degenerate Sklyanin algebra $S_{1,-1,0} = k \langle x,y,z \rangle /( xy-yx, yz-zy, zx- xz)$ and is therefore an example of a non-degenerate Sklyanin algebra.

== Point modules ==
The study of point modules is a useful tool which can be used much more widely than just for Sklyanin algebras. Point modules are a way of finding projective geometry in the underlying structure of noncommutative graded rings. Originally, the study of point modules was applied to show some of the properties of non-degenerate Sklyanin algebras. For example to find their Hilbert series and determine that non-degenerate Sklyanin algebras do not contain zero divisors.

=== Non-degenerate Sklyanin algebras ===
Whenever $abc \neq 0$ and $\left( \frac{a^3+b^3+c^3}{3abc} \right) ^3 \neq 1$ in the definition of a non-degenerate Sklyanin algebra $S=S_{a,b,c}$, the point modules of $S$ are parametrised by an elliptic curve. If the parameters $a,b,c$ do not satisfy those constraints, the point modules of any non-degenerate Sklyanin algebra are still parametrised by a closed projective variety on the projective plane. If $S$ is a Sklyanin algebra whose point modules are parametrised by an elliptic curve, then there exists an element $g \in S$ which annihilates all point modules i.e. $Mg = 0$ for all point modules $M$ of $S$.

=== Degenerate Sklyanin algebras ===
The point modules of degenerate Sklyanin algebras are not parametrised by a projective variety.
