= Kaup–Kupershmidt equation =

The Kaup–Kupershmidt equation (named after David J. Kaup and Boris Abram Kupershmidt) is the nonlinear fifth-order partial differential equation

$$u_t = u_{xxxxx}+10u_{xxx}u+25u_{xx}u_x+20u^2u_x = \frac16 (6u_{xxxx}+60uu_{xx}+45u_x^2+40u^3)_x.$$

It is the first equation in a hierarchy of integrable equations with the Lax operator

$$\partial_x^3 + 2u\partial_x + u_x,$$.

It has properties similar (but not identical) to those of the better-known KdV hierarchy in which the Lax operator has order 2.
