= Discrete system =

System with a countable number of states

In theoretical computer science, a discrete system is a system with a countable number of states. Discrete systems may be contrasted with continuous systems, which may also be called analog systems. A final discrete system is often modeled with a directed graph and is analyzed for correctness and complexity according to computational theory. Because discrete systems have a countable number of states, they may be described in precise mathematical models.

A computer is a finite-state machine that may be viewed as a discrete system. Because computers are often used to model not only other discrete systems but continuous systems as well, methods have been developed to represent real-world continuous systems as discrete systems. One such method involves sampling a continuous signal at discrete time intervals.

== See also ==
- Digital control
- Finite-state machine
- Frequency spectrum
- Mathematical model
- Sample and hold
- Sample rate
- Sample time
- Z-transform
