= Super Tonks–Girardeau gas =

In physics, the super Tonks–Girardeau gas represents an excited quantum gas phase with strong attractive interactions in a one-dimensional spatial geometry.

Usually, strongly attractive quantum gases are expected to form dense particle clusters and lose all gas-like properties. But in 2005, it was proposed by Stefano Giorgini and co-workers that there is a many-body state of attractively interacting bosons that does not decay in one-dimensional systems. If prepared in a special way, this lowest gas-like state should be stable and show new quantum mechanical properties.

Particles in a super-Tonks gas should be strongly correlated and show long range order with a Luttinger liquid parameter K<1. Since each particle occupies a certain volume, the gas properties are similar to a classical gas of hard rods. Despite the mutual attraction, the single particle wave functions separate and the bosons behave similar to fermions with repulsive, long-range interaction.

To prepare the super-Tonks–Girardeau phase it is necessary to increase the repulsive interaction strength all the way through the Tonks–Girardeau regime up to infinity. Sudden switching from infinitely strong repulsive to infinitely attractive interactions stabilizes the gas against collapse and connects the ground state of the Tonks gas to the excited state of the super-Tonks gas.

== Experimental realization ==
The super-Tonks–Girardeau gas was experimentally observed in Ref. using an ultracold gas of cesium atoms. Reducing the magnitude of the attractive interactions caused the gas to became unstable to collapse into cluster-like bound states. Repulsive dipolar interactions stabilize the gas when instead using highly magnetic dysprosium atoms. This enabled the creation of prethermal quantum many-body scar states via the topological pumping of these super-Tonks-Girardeau gases.
