= Gelfand–Kirillov dimension =

In algebra, the Gelfand–Kirillov dimension (or GK dimension) of a right module M over a k-algebra A is:

$$\operatorname{GKdim} = \sup_{V, M_0} \limsup_{n\to\infty} \log_n \dim_k M_0 V^n$$

where the supremum is taken over all finite-dimensional subspaces $V \subset A$ and $M_0 \subset M$.

An algebra is said to have polynomial growth if its Gelfand–Kirillov dimension is finite.

== Basic facts ==
- The Gelfand–Kirillov dimension of a finitely generated commutative algebra A over a field is the Krull dimension of A (or equivalently the transcendence degree of the field of fractions of A over the base field.)
- In particular, the GK dimension of the polynomial ring $k[x_1, \dots, x_n]$ Is n.
- (Warfield) For any real number r ≥ 2, there exists a finitely generated algebra whose GK dimension is r.

== In the theory of D-Modules ==
Given a right module M over the Weyl algebra $A_n$, the Gelfand–Kirillov dimension of M over the Weyl algebra coincides with the dimension of M, which is by definition the degree of the Hilbert polynomial of M. This enables to prove additivity in short exact sequences for the Gelfand–Kirillov dimension and finally to prove Bernstein's inequality, which states that the dimension of M must be at least n. This leads to the definition of holonomic D-modules as those with the minimal dimension n, and these modules play a great role in the geometric Langlands program.
