= Lieb–Liniger model =

Physics models of a 1D gas of bosons

In physics, the Lieb–Liniger model describes a gas of particles moving in one dimension and satisfying Bose–Einstein statistics. More specifically, it describes a one dimensional Bose gas with Dirac delta interactions. It is named after Elliott H. Lieb and Werner Liniger who introduced the model in 1963. The model was developed to compare and test Nikolay Bogolyubov's theory of a weakly interacting Bose gas. It can be seen as one model in the theory of generalized hydrodynamics.

== Definition ==
Given $N$ bosons moving in one-dimension on the $x$-axis defined from $[0,L]$ with periodic boundary conditions, a state of the N-body system must be described by a many-body wave function $\psi(x_1, x_2, \dots, x_j, \dots,x_N)$. The Hamiltonian, of this model is introduced as

$$H = -\sum_{i=1}^N \frac{\partial^2}{\partial x_i^2} + 2c \sum_{i=1}^N\sum_{j>i}^N \delta(x_i-x_j)\ ,$$

where $\delta$ is the Dirac delta function. The constant $c$ denotes the strength of the interaction, $c>0$ represents a repulsive interaction and $c<0$ an attractive interaction. The hard core limit $c\to\infty$ is known as the Tonks–Girardeau gas.

For a collection of bosons, the wave function is unchanged under permutation of any two particles (permutation symmetry), i.e., $\psi(\dots, x_i,\dots, x_j, \dots) = \psi(\dots, x_j,\dots, x_i, \dots)$ for all $i \neq j$ and $\psi$ satisfies $\psi( \dots, x_j=0, \dots ) =\psi(\dots, x_j=L,\dots )$ for all $j$.

The delta function in the Hamiltonian gives rise to a boundary condition when two coordinates, say $x_1$ and $x_2$ are equal. The condition is that as $x_2$ approaches $x_1$ from above ($x_2 \searrow x_1$), the derivative satisfies

$$\left.\left(\frac{\partial}{\partial x_2} - \frac{\partial}{\partial x_1} \right) \psi (x_1, x_2)\right|_{x_2=x_1+}= c \psi (x_1=x_2)$$.

== Solution ==
Fig. 1: The ground state energy (per particle) $e$ as a function of the interaction strength per density $\gamma=Lc/N$, from.

The time-independent Schrödinger equation $H\psi = E\psi$, is solved by explicit construction of $\psi$. Since $\psi$ is symmetric it is completely determined by its values in the simplex $\mathcal{R}$, defined by the condition that $0 \leq x_1 \leq x_2 \leq \dots, \leq x_N \leq L$.

The solution can be written in the form of a Bethe ansatz as

$$\psi(x_1, \dots, x_N) =  \sum_P a(P)\exp \left( i \sum_{j=1}^N k_{P j} x_j\right)$$,

with wave vectors $0 \leq k_1 \leq k_2 \leq \dots, \leq k_N$, where the sum is over all $N !$ permutations, $P$, of the integers $1,2, \dots, N$, and $P$ maps $1,2,\dots,N$ to $P_1,P_2,\dots,P_N$. The coefficients $a(P)$, as well as the $k$'s are determined by the condition $H\psi =E\psi$, and this leads to a total energy

$$E= \sum_{j=1}^N\, k_j^2$$,

with the amplitudes given by

$a(P) = \prod_{1\leq i<j \leq N} \left(1+\frac{ic}{k_{Pi} -k_{Pj}}\right) \, .$

These equations determine $\psi$ in terms of the $k$'s. These lead to $N$ equations:

$$L\,  k_j= 2\pi I_j\  -2 \sum_{i=1}^N  \arctan \left(\frac{k_j-k_i}{c} \right)    \qquad \qquad \text{for } j=1, \, \dots,\, N \   ,$$

where $I_1 < I_2 < \cdots < I_N$ are integers when $N$ is odd and, when $N$ is even, they take values $\pm \frac12, \pm \frac32, \dots$ . For the ground state the $I$'s satisfy

$$I_{j+1} - I_j = 1, \quad {\rm for} \ 1\leq  j <N \qquad
\text{and } I_1=-I_N.$$
