= Bethe ansatz =

Method for finding the exact solution of certain quantum mechanics models

In physics, the Bethe ansatz is used to calculate the exact wave functions of certain quantum-mechanical many-body systems, most commonly in one spatial dimension. This ansatz was introduced by Hans Bethe in 1931 to obtain the exact eigenvalues and eigenvectors of the one-dimensional antiferromagnetic isotropic (XXX) Heisenberg model.

The approach was later generalized into the quantum inverse scattering method (QISM) and the algebraic Bethe ansatz, forming the basis of modern integrable system theory.

Since then, the method has been extended to other spin chains, statistical lattice models and generalized hydrodynamics.

"Bethe ansatz problems" were one of the topics featuring in the "To learn" section of Richard Feynman's blackboard at the time of his death.

== Discussion ==
In the framework of many-body quantum mechanics, models solvable by the Bethe ansatz can be contrasted with free fermion models. The dynamics of a free model is one-body reducible: its many-body wave function for fermions (bosons) is the antisymmetrized (symmetrized) product of one-body wave functions. Models solvable by the Bethe ansatz are interacting systems: their two-body sector has a nontrivial scattering matrix that depends on the particle momenta.

By contrast, such models are two-body reducible: the many-body scattering matrix factorizes into a product of two-body scattering matrices. Many-body collisions occur as sequences of pairwise interactions, and the total wave function can be represented entirely in terms of two-body scattering states. The overall scattering matrix equals the ordered product of these pairwise matrices.

$$\Psi_M(j_1, \cdots, j_M) = \prod_{M \geq a > b \geq 1} \operatorname{sgn}(j_a - j_b) \sum_{P \in \mathfrak S_M} (-1)^{[P]} \exp \left(i \sum_{a=1}^M k_{P_a} j_a + \frac{i}{2}\sum_{M \geq a > b \geq 1} \operatorname{sgn}(j_a - j_b) \phi(k_{P_a}, k_{P_b})\right),$$

where $M$ is the number of particles, $j_a\ (a = 1, \cdots M)$ are their position, $\mathfrak S_M$ is the set of all permutations of the integers $1, \cdots, M$; $(-1)^{[P]} = \pm 1$ is the parity of the permutation $P$; $k_a$ is the (quasi-)momentum of the $a$-th particle, $\phi$ is the scattering phase shift function and $\operatorname{sgn}$ is the sign function. This form is universal (at least for non-nested systems), with the momentum and scattering functions being model-dependent.

The Yang–Baxter equation guarantees consistency of the construction. The Pauli exclusion principle is valid for models solvable by the Bethe ansatz, even for models of interacting bosons.

The ground state is a Fermi sphere. Periodic boundary conditions lead to the Bethe ansatz equations or simply Bethe equations. In logarithmic form the Bethe ansatz equations can be generated by the Yang action. The square of the norm of Bethe wave function is equal to the determinant of the Hessian of the Yang action.

A substantial generalization is the quantum inverse scattering method, or algebraic Bethe ansatz, which gives an ansatz for the underlying operator algebra that "has allowed a wide class of nonlinear evolution equations to be solved".

The exact solutions of the so-called s-d model (by P. B. Wiegmann in 1980 and independently by N. Andrei, also in 1980) and the Anderson model (by P. B. Wiegmann in 1981, and by N. Kawakami and A. Okiji in 1981) are also both based on the Bethe ansatz. There exist multi-channel generalizations of these two models also amenable to exact solutions (by N. Andrei and C. Destri and by C. J. Bolech and N. Andrei). Recently several models solvable by Bethe ansatz were realized experimentally in solid states and optical lattices. An important role in the theoretical description of these experiments was played by Jean-Sébastien Caux and Alexei Tsvelik.

== Terminology ==
There are many similar methods which come under the name of Bethe ansatz

- Algebraic Bethe ansatz. The quantum inverse scattering method is the method of solution by algebraic Bethe ansatz, and the two are practically synonymous.
- Analytic Bethe ansatz
- Coordinate Bethe ansatz (Hans Bethe 1931)
- Functional Bethe ansatz
- Nested Bethe ansatz
- Thermodynamic Bethe ansatz (C. N. Yang & C. P. Yang 1969)

== Examples ==
=== Heisenberg antiferromagnetic chain ===
The Heisenberg antiferromagnetic chain is defined by the Hamiltonian (assuming periodic boundary conditions)

$$H = J \sum_{j=1}^N \mathbf{S}_j \cdot \mathbf{S}_{j+1}, \quad \mathbf{S}_{j+N} \equiv \mathbf{S}_j.$$

This model is solvable using the (coordinate) Bethe ansatz. The scattering phase shift function is $\phi\big(k_a(\lambda_a), k_b(\lambda_b)\big) = \theta_2(\lambda_a - \lambda_b)$ with $\theta_n(\lambda) \equiv 2 \arctan(2\lambda/n),$ in which the momentum has been conveniently reparametrized as $k(\lambda) = \pi - 2 \arctan 2\lambda$ in terms of the rapidity $\lambda.$ The boundary conditions (periodic here) impose the Bethe equations

$$\left[\frac{\lambda_a + i/2}{\lambda_a - i/2}\right]^N =
\prod_{b \neq a}^M \frac{\lambda_a - \lambda_b + i}{\lambda_a - \lambda_b - i}, \quad a = 1, \dots, M,$$

or more conveniently in logarithmic form

$$\theta_1(\lambda_a) - \frac{1}{N} \sum_{b = 1}^M \theta_2(\lambda_a - \lambda_b) = 2\pi \frac{I_a}{N},$$

where the quantum numbers $I_j$ are distinct half-odd integers for $N - M$ even, integers for $N - M$ odd (with $I_j$ defined $\bmod N$).

== Applicability ==
The following systems can be solved using the Bethe ansatz

- Anderson impurity model
- Gaudin model
- XXX and XXZ Heisenberg spin chain for arbitrary spin $s$
- Hubbard model
- Kondo model
- Lieb–Liniger model
- Six-vertex model and Eight-vertex model (through Heisenberg spin chain)

== Chronology ==
- 1928: Werner Heisenberg publishes his model.
- 1930: Felix Bloch proposes an oversimplified ansatz which miscounts the number of solutions to the Schrödinger equation for the Heisenberg chain.
- 1931: Hans Bethe proposes the correct ansatz and carefully shows that it yields the correct number of eigenfunctions.
- 1938: Lamek Hulthén obtains the exact ground-state energy of the Heisenberg model.
- 1958: Raymond Lee Orbach uses the Bethe ansatz to solve the Heisenberg model with anisotropic interactions.
- 1962: J. des Cloizeaux and J. J. Pearson obtain the correct spectrum of the Heisenberg antiferromagnet (spinon dispersion relation), showing that it differs from Anderson's spin-wave theory predictions (the constant prefactor is different).
- 1963: Elliott H. Lieb and Werner Liniger provide the exact solution of the 1d δ-function interacting Bose gas (now known as the Lieb-Liniger model). Lieb studies the spectrum and defines two basic types of excitations.
- 1964: Robert B. Griffiths obtains the magnetization curve of the Heisenberg model at zero temperature.
- 1966: C. N. Yang and C. P. Yang rigorously prove that the ground-state of the Heisenberg chain is given by the Bethe ansatz. They study properties and applications in and.
- 1967: C. N. Yang generalizes Lieb and Liniger's solution of the δ-function interacting Bose gas to arbitrary permutation symmetry of the wavefunction, giving birth to the nested Bethe ansatz.
- 1968: Elliott H. Lieb and F. Y. Wu solve the 1d Hubbard model.
- 1969: C. N. Yang and C. P. Yang obtain the thermodynamics of the Lieb-Liniger model, providing the basis of the thermodynamic Bethe ansatz (TBA).
