= Evgeny Sklyanin =

- Born: 24 May 1955 (age 71); Leningrad, Soviet Union
- Education: Leningrad Polytechnical Institute (1978); Steklov Mathematical Institute (Ph.D., 1980); Steklov Mathematical Institute (DrSci (habilitation), 1989)
- Known for: Sklyanin bracket, Sklyanin algebra
- Scientific career
- Fields: Mathematical Physics
- Workplaces: Steklov Mathematical Institute; University of York
- Thesis: Quantum Variant of the Inverse Scattering Method (1980)
- Doctoral advisor: Ludvig Faddeev

Evgeny Konstantinovich Sklyanin (Russian: Евгений Константинович Склянин, born 24 May 1955 in Leningrad, Soviet Union) is a mathematical physicist, currently a professor of mathematics at the University of York. His research is in the fields of integrable systems and quantum groups. His major contributions are in the theory of quantum integrable systems, separation of variables, special functions.

== Biography ==
He graduated from the Department of Physics, Leningrad State University (USSR) in 1978 and earned PhD (Candidate) in 1980 and DrSci (Habilitation) degree in 1989, both at Steklov Mathematical Institute, St. Petersburg. He then held various research positions at Steklov until 2001, when he moved to the University of York.

He provided, via particular examples, ideas that led to the discovery of quantum groups and Yangians. He pioneered the investigation of quantum integrable systems with boundaries. He developed the method of separation of variables in the theory of integrable systems.

He was elected Fellow of the Royal Society in 2008.
