= Integrable system =

Property of certain dynamical systems

In mathematics, integrability is a property of certain dynamical systems, that means very roughly that the solutions of the system are "simple" enough that they can be written down exactly (in principle). More precisely, while there are several distinct formal definitions, an integrable system can be thought of as a dynamical system with sufficiently many conserved quantities, or first integrals, that its motion is confined to a submanifold of much smaller dimensionality than that of its phase space. Integrable systems are in this sense the opposite of chaotic systems, where small changes in initial conditions create wild deviations in the phase space behavior of solutions.

Three features are often referred to as characterizing integrable systems:

- the existence of a maximal set of conserved quantities (the usual defining property of complete integrability)
- the existence of algebraic invariants, having a basis in algebraic geometry (a property known sometimes as algebraic integrability)
- the explicit determination of solutions in an explicit functional form (not an intrinsic property, but something often referred to as solvability)

Integrable systems may be seen as very different in qualitative character from more generic dynamical systems, which are more typically chaotic systems. The latter generally have no conserved quantities, and are asymptotically intractable, since an arbitrarily small perturbation in initial conditions may lead to arbitrarily large deviations in their trajectories over a sufficiently large time.

Many systems studied in physics are completely integrable, in particular, in the Hamiltonian sense, the key example being multi-dimensional harmonic oscillators. Another standard example is planetary motion about either one fixed center (e.g., the sun) or two. Other elementary examples include the motion of a rigid body about its center of mass (the Euler top) and the motion of an axially symmetric rigid body about a point in its axis of symmetry (the Lagrange top).

In the late 1960s, it was realized that there are completely integrable systems in physics having an infinite number of degrees of freedom, such as some models of shallow water waves (Korteweg–de Vries equation), the Kerr effect in optical fibres, described by the nonlinear Schrödinger equation, and certain integrable many-body systems, such as the Toda lattice. The modern theory of integrable systems was revived with the numerical discovery of solitons by Martin Kruskal and Norman Zabusky in 1965, which led to the inverse scattering transform method in 1967.

In the special case of Hamiltonian systems, if there are enough independent Poisson commuting first integrals for the flow parameters to be able to serve as a coordinate system on the invariant level sets (the leaves of the Lagrangian foliation), and if the flows are complete and the energy level set is compact, this implies the Liouville–Arnold theorem; i.e., the existence of action-angle variables. General dynamical systems have no such conserved quantities; in the case of autonomous Hamiltonian systems, the energy is generally the only one, and on the energy level sets, the flows are typically chaotic.

A key ingredient in characterizing integrable systems is the Frobenius theorem, which states that a system is Frobenius integrable (i.e., is generated by an integrable distribution) if, locally, it has a foliation by maximal integral manifolds. But integrability, in the sense of dynamical systems, is a global property, not a local one, since it requires that the foliation be a regular one, with the leaves embedded submanifolds.

Integrability does not necessarily imply that generic solutions can be explicitly expressed in terms of some known set of special functions; it is an intrinsic property of the geometry and topology of the system, and the nature of the dynamics.

== General dynamical systems ==
In the context of differentiable dynamical systems, the notion of integrability refers to the existence of invariant, regular foliations; i.e., ones whose leaves are embedded submanifolds of the smallest possible dimension that are invariant under the flow. There is thus a variable notion of the degree of integrability, depending on the dimension of the leaves of the invariant foliation. This concept has a refinement in the case of Hamiltonian systems, known as complete integrability in the sense of Liouville (see below), which is what is most frequently referred to in this context.

An extension of the notion of integrability is also applicable to discrete systems such as lattices. This definition can be adapted to describe evolution equations that either are systems of differential equations or finite difference equations.

The distinction between integrable and nonintegrable dynamical systems has the qualitative implication of regular motion vs. chaotic motion and hence is an intrinsic property, not just a matter of whether a system can be explicitly integrated in an exact form.

== Hamiltonian systems and Liouville integrability ==
In the special setting of Hamiltonian systems, we have the notion of integrability in the Liouville sense. (See the Liouville–Arnold theorem.) Liouville integrability means that there exists a regular foliation of the phase space by invariant manifolds such that the Hamiltonian vector fields associated with the invariants of the foliation span the tangent distribution. Another way to state this is that there exists a maximal set of functionally independent Poisson commuting invariants (i.e., independent functions on the phase space whose Poisson brackets with the Hamiltonian of the system, and with each other, vanish).

In finite dimensions, if the phase space is symplectic (i.e., the center of the Poisson algebra consists only of constants), it must have even dimension $2n,$ and the maximal number of independent Poisson commuting invariants (including the Hamiltonian itself) is $n$. The leaves of the foliation are totally isotropic with respect to the symplectic form and such a maximal isotropic foliation is called Lagrangian. All autonomous Hamiltonian systems (i.e. those for which the Hamiltonian and Poisson brackets are not explicitly time-dependent) have at least one invariant; namely, the Hamiltonian itself, whose value along the flow is the energy. If the energy level sets are compact, the leaves of the Lagrangian foliation are tori, and the natural linear coordinates on these are called "angle" variables. The cycles of the canonical $1$-form are called the action variables, and the resulting canonical coordinates are called action-angle variables (see below).

There is also a distinction between complete integrability, in the Liouville sense, and partial integrability, as well as a notion of superintegrability and maximal superintegrability. Essentially, these distinctions correspond to the dimensions of the leaves of the foliation. When the number of independent Poisson commuting invariants is less than maximal (but, in the case of autonomous systems, more than one), we say the system is partially integrable. When there exist further functionally independent invariants, beyond the maximal number that can be Poisson commuting, and hence the dimension of the leaves of the invariant foliation is less than n, we say the system is superintegrable. If there is a regular foliation with one-dimensional leaves (curves), this is called maximally superintegrable.

== Action-angle variables ==
When a finite-dimensional Hamiltonian system is completely integrable in the Liouville sense, and the energy level sets are compact, the flows are complete, and the leaves of the invariant foliation are tori. There then exist, as mentioned above, special sets of canonical coordinates on the phase space known as action-angle variables, such that the invariant tori are the joint level sets of the action variables. These thus provide a complete set of invariants of the Hamiltonian flow (constants of motion), and the angle variables are the natural periodic coordinates on the tori. The motion on the invariant tori, expressed in terms of these canonical coordinates, is linear in the angle variables.

== The Hamilton–Jacobi approach ==
In canonical transformation theory, there is the Hamilton–Jacobi method, in which solutions to Hamilton's equations are sought by first finding a complete solution of the associated Hamilton–Jacobi equation. In classical terminology, this is described as determining a transformation to a canonical set of coordinates consisting of completely ignorable variables; i.e., those in which there is no dependence of the Hamiltonian on a complete set of canonical "position" coordinates, and hence the corresponding canonically conjugate momenta are all conserved quantities. In the case of compact energy level sets, this is the first step towards determining the action-angle variables. In the general theory of partial differential equations of Hamilton–Jacobi type, a complete solution (i.e. one that depends on n independent constants of integration, where n is the dimension of the configuration space), exists in very general cases, but only in the local sense. Therefore, the existence of a complete solution of the Hamilton–Jacobi equation is by no means a characterization of complete integrability in the Liouville sense. Most cases that can be "explicitly integrated" involve a complete separation of variables, in which the separation constants provide the complete set of integration constants that are required. Only when these constants can be reinterpreted, within the full phase space setting, as the values of a complete set of Poisson commuting functions restricted to the leaves of a Lagrangian foliation, can the system be regarded as completely integrable in the Liouville sense.

== Solitons and inverse spectral methods ==
A resurgence of interest in classical integrable systems came with the discovery, in the late 1960s, that solitons, which are strongly stable, localized solutions of partial differential equations like the Korteweg–de Vries equation (which describes 1-dimensional non-dissipative fluid dynamics in shallow basins), could be understood by viewing these equations as infinite-dimensional integrable Hamiltonian systems. Their study leads to a very fruitful approach for "integrating" such systems, the inverse scattering transform and more general inverse spectral methods (often reducible to Riemann–Hilbert problems), which generalize local linear methods like Fourier analysis to nonlocal linearization, through the solution of associated integral equations.

The basic idea of this method is to introduce a linear operator that is determined by the position in phase space and which evolves under the dynamics of the system in question in such a way that its "spectrum" (in a suitably generalized sense) is invariant under the evolution, cf. Lax pair. This provides, in certain cases, enough invariants, or "integrals of motion" to make the system completely integrable. In the case of systems having an infinite number of degrees of freedom, such as the KdV equation, this is not sufficient to make precise the property of Liouville integrability. However, for suitably defined boundary conditions, the spectral transform can, in fact, be interpreted as a transformation to completely ignorable coordinates, in which the conserved quantities form half of a doubly infinite set of canonical coordinates, and the flow linearizes in these. In some cases, this may even be seen as a transformation to action-angle variables, although typically only a finite number of the "position" variables are actually angle coordinates, and the rest are noncompact.

== Hirota bilinear equations and τ-functions ==
Another viewpoint that arose in the modern theory of integrable systems originated in a calculational approach pioneered by Ryogo Hirota, which involved replacing the original nonlinear dynamical system with a bilinear system of constant coefficient equations for an auxiliary quantity, which later came to be known as the τ-function. These are now referred to as the Hirota equations. Although originally appearing just as a calculational device, without any clear relation to the inverse scattering approach, or the Hamiltonian structure, this nevertheless gave a very direct method from which important classes of solutions such as solitons could be derived.

Subsequently, this was interpreted by Mikio Sato and his students, at first for the case of integrable hierarchies of PDEs, such as the Kadomtsev–Petviashvili hierarchy, but then for much more general classes of integrable hierarchies, as a sort of universal phase space approach, in which, typically, the commuting dynamics were viewed simply as determined by a fixed (finite or infinite) abelian group action on a (finite or infinite) Grassmann manifold. The τ-function was viewed as the determinant of a projection operator from elements of the group orbit to some origin within the Grassmannian, and the Hirota equations as expressing the Plücker relations, characterizing the Plücker embedding of the Grassmannian in the projectivization of a suitably defined (infinite) exterior space, viewed as a fermionic Fock space.

== Algebraic integrability ==
=== Weak integrability ===
A birational map $\phi : \mathbb A ^N$⇢ $\mathbb A ^N$is said to be weakly algebraicly integrable if there exists a non-constant rational map $I : \mathbb A ^N$⇢ $\mathbb A ^N$ satisfying $I \circ \phi = I$ as rational maps.

=== Complete integrability over the complex numbers ===
Let $M$ be non-singular affine variety over $\mathbb C$, and consider a completely integrable (see above) dynamic on it, with hamiltonian $H=(H_1,\dots,H_n)$. This dynamic is said to be algebraic completely integrable (a.c.i) if for generic $c \in \mathbb C^n$, the level set $F_c$ is an affine part of an abelian variety (usually the jacobian of a spectral curve) and the hamiltonian vector fields $\Chi_{F_i}$are translation invariant when restricted to this fiber.

== Diophantine integrability ==
Let $\phi$ be a birationnal map acting on a projective space considered over a finite field $\mathbb P^N( \mathbb F_q )$. It is said to be diophantine integrable if for any rational point $P$, the height of the iterates $h(\phi^n(P))$ doesn't grow faster than polynomially in $n$.

== Quantum integrable systems ==
There is also a notion of quantum integrable systems.

In the quantum setting, functions on phase space must be replaced by self-adjoint operators on a Hilbert space, and the notion of Poisson commuting functions replaced by commuting operators. The notion of conservation laws must be specialized to local conservation laws. Every Hamiltonian has an infinite set of conserved quantities given by projectors to its energy eigenstates. However, this does not imply any special dynamical structure.

To explain quantum integrability, it is helpful to consider the free particle setting. Here all dynamics are one-body reducible. A quantum system is said to be integrable if the dynamics are two-body reducible. The Yang–Baxter equation is a consequence of this reducibility and leads to trace identities which provide an infinite set of conserved quantities. All of these ideas are incorporated into the quantum inverse scattering method where the algebraic Bethe ansatz can be used to obtain explicit solutions. Examples of quantum integrable models are the Lieb–Liniger model, the Hubbard model and several variations on the Heisenberg model. Some other types of quantum integrability are known in explicitly time-dependent quantum problems, such as the driven Tavis-Cummings model.

== Exactly solvable models ==
In physics, completely integrable systems, especially in the infinite-dimensional setting, are often referred to as exactly solvable models. This obscures the distinction between integrability, in the Hamiltonian sense, and the more general dynamical systems sense.

There are also exactly solvable models in statistical mechanics, which are more closely related to quantum integrable systems than classical ones. Two closely related methods: the Bethe ansatz approach, in its modern sense, based on the Yang–Baxter equations and the quantum inverse scattering method, provide quantum analogs of the inverse spectral methods. These are equally important in the study of solvable models in statistical mechanics.

An imprecise notion of "exact solvability" as meaning: "The solutions can be expressed explicitly in terms of some previously known functions" is also sometimes used, as though this were an intrinsic property of the system itself, rather than the purely calculational feature that we happen to have some "known" functions available, in terms of which the solutions may be expressed. This notion has no intrinsic meaning, since what is meant by "known" functions very often is defined precisely by the fact that they satisfy certain given equations, and the list of such "known functions" is constantly growing. Although such a characterization of "integrability" has no intrinsic validity, it often implies the sort of regularity that is to be expected in integrable systems.

== List of some well-known integrable systems ==
=== Classical mechanical systems ===
- Calogero–Moser–Sutherland model
- Central force motion (exact solutions of classical central-force problems)
- Geodesic motion on ellipsoids
- Harmonic oscillator
- Integrable Clebsch and Steklov systems in fluids
- Lagrange, Euler, and Kovalevskaya tops
- Neumann oscillator
- Two center Newtonian gravitational motion

=== Integrable lattice models ===
- Ablowitz–Ladik lattice
- Toda lattice
- Volterra lattice

=== Integrable systems in 1 + 1 dimensions ===
- AKNS system
- Benjamin–Ono equation
- Boussinesq equation (water waves)
- Camassa–Holm equation
- Classical Heisenberg ferromagnet model (spin chain)
- Degasperis–Procesi equation
- Dym equation
- Garnier integrable system
- Kaup–Kupershmidt equation
- Krichever–Novikov equation
- Korteweg–de Vries equation
- Landau–Lifshitz equation (continuous spin field)
- Nonlinear Schrödinger equation
- Nonlinear sigma models
- Sine–Gordon equation
- Thirring model
- Three-wave equation

=== Integrable PDEs in 2 + 1 dimensions ===
- Davey–Stewartson equation
- Ishimori equation
- Kadomtsev–Petviashvili equation
- Novikov–Veselov equation

=== Integrable PDEs in 3 + 1 dimensions ===
- The Belinski–Zakharov transform generates a Lax pair for the Einstein field equations; general solutions are termed gravitational solitons, of which the Schwarzschild metric, the Kerr metric and some gravitational wave solutions are examples.

=== Exactly solvable statistical lattice models ===
- 8-vertex model
- Ice-type model of Lieb
- Gaudin model
- Ising model in 1- and 2-dimensions
- ZN model (or clock model) in 1- and 2-dimensions
- Quantum Heisenberg model

=== Discrete integrable systems ===
- The pentagram map and some of its generalisations

== See also ==
- Anti-integrability
- Hitchin system
- Integrable algorithm
- Mathematical physics
- Painlevé transcendents
- Soliton
- Statistical mechanics

=== Some key contributors (since 1965) ===
- Mark Ablowitz
- Rodney Baxter
- Percy Deift
- Leonid Dickey
- Vladimir Drinfeld
- Boris Dubrovin
- Ludvig Faddeev
- Hermann Flaschka
- Israel Gel'fand
- Alexander Its
- Michio Jimbo
- Igor M. Krichever
- Martin Kruskal
- Peter Lax
- Vladimir Matveev
- Henry McKean
- Robert Miura
- Tetsuji Miwa
- Alan Newell
- Nicolai Reshetikhin
- Aleksei Shabat
- Evgeny Sklyanin
- Mikio Sato
- Elliott H. Lieb
- Graeme Segal
- George Wilson
- Vladimir E. Zakharov
