= Nikolay Nekhoroshev =

Soviet and Russian mathematician

Nikolai Nikolaevich Nekhoroshev (Russian: Николай Николаевич Нехорошев; 2 October 1946 – 18 October 2008) was a prominent Soviet Russian mathematician specializing in classical mechanics and dynamical systems. His research concerned Hamiltonian mechanics, perturbation theory, celestial mechanics, integrable systems, dynamical systems, the quasiclassical approximation, and singularity theory. He proved, in particular, a stability result in KAM-theory stating that, under certain conditions, solutions of nearly integrable systems stay close to invariant tori for exponentially long times (Giorgilli 1989).

Nekhoroshev was professor of the Moscow State University and University of Milan. He was an alumnus of Moscow's boarding school no. 18 (1964).

Winner of the Kolmogorov Prize (1997).

Nekhoroshev obtained his PhD in 1973 from Lomonosov Moscow State University under the supervision of Vladimir Arnold.

== See also ==
- Nekhoroshev estimates
