= Stadium (geometry) =

Geometric shape of rectangle and two semicircles

Parameters of a stadium

The Bunimovich stadium, a chaotic dynamical system based on the stadium shape

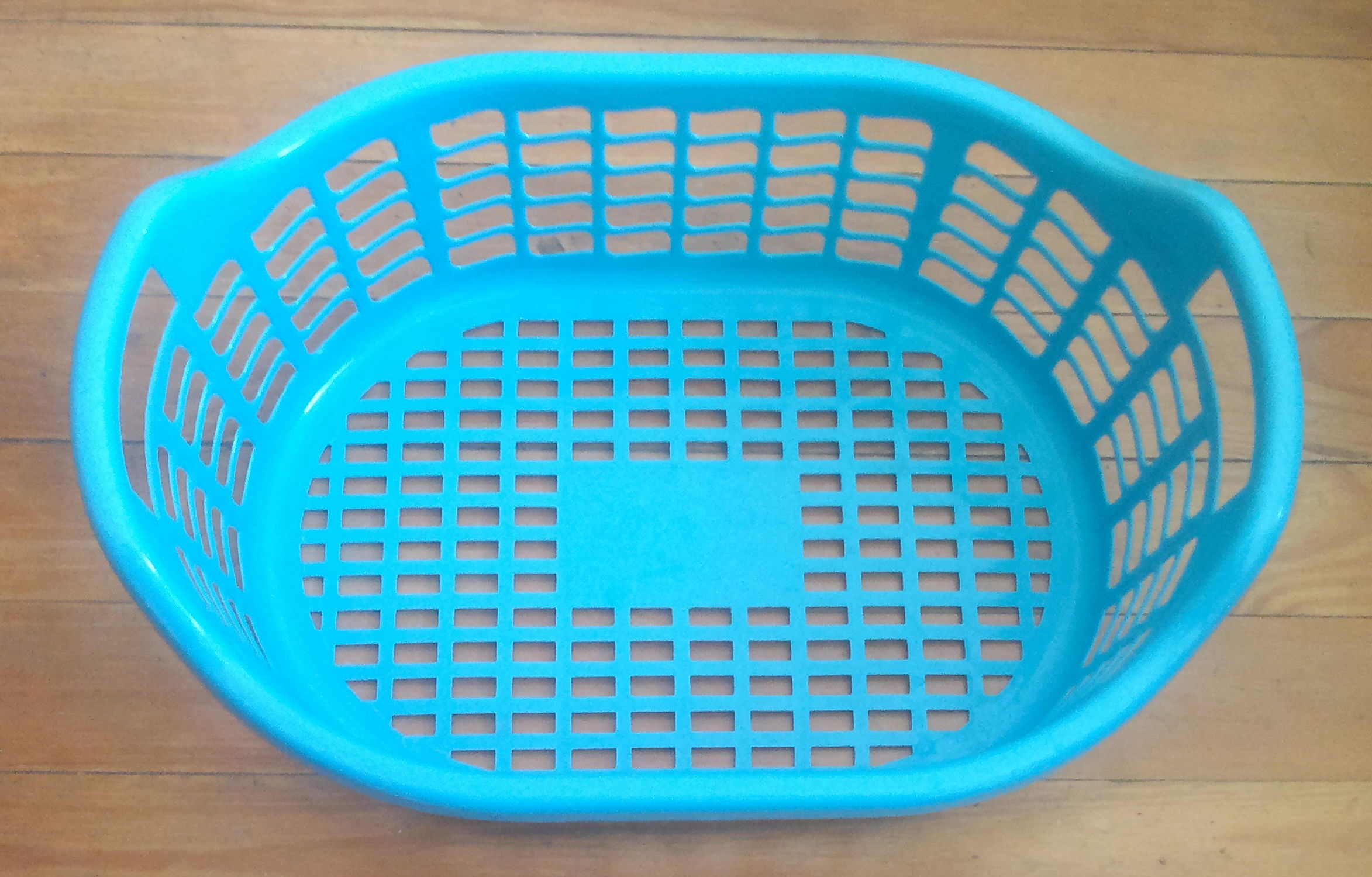
The bottom of this plastic basket is stadium-shaped.

A stadium is a two-dimensional geometric shape constructed of a rectangle with semicircles at a pair of opposite sides. The same shape is known also as a pill shape, discorectangle, obround, racetrack or sausage body.

The shape is based on a stadium, a place used for athletics and horse racing tracks.

A stadium may be constructed as the Minkowski sum of a disk and a line segment. Alternatively, it is the neighborhood of points within a given distance from a line segment. A stadium is a type of oval. However, unlike some other ovals such as the ellipses, it is not an algebraic curve because different parts of its boundary are defined by different equations.

== Formulas ==
The perimeter of a stadium is calculated by the formula $P = 2 (\pi r+a)$ where a is the length of the straight sides and r is the radius of the semicircles. With the same parameters, the area of the stadium is $A = \pi r^2 + 2ra = r(\pi r + 2a)$.

== Bunimovich stadium ==
When this shape is used in the study of dynamical billiards, it is called the Bunimovich stadium. Leonid Bunimovich used this shape to show that it is possible for billiard tracks to exhibit chaotic behavior (positive Lyapunov exponent and exponential divergence of paths) even within a convex billiard table.

== Related shapes ==
A capsule is produced by revolving a stadium around the line of symmetry that bisects the semicircles.
