= Nekhoroshev estimates =

Result in theory of Hamiltonian systems

The Nekhoroshev estimates are an important result in the theory of Hamiltonian systems concerning the long-time stability of solutions of integrable systems under a small perturbation of the Hamiltonian. The first paper on the subject was written by Nikolay Nekhoroshev in 1971.

The theorem complements both the Kolmogorov–Arnold–Moser theorem and the phenomenon of instability for nearly integrable Hamiltonian systems, sometimes called Arnold diffusion, in the following way: the KAM theorem tells us that many solutions to nearly integrable Hamiltonian systems persist under a perturbation for all time, while, as Vladimir Arnold first demonstrated in 1964, some solutions do not stay close to their integrable counterparts for all time. The Nekhoroshev estimates tell us that, nonetheless, all solutions stay close to their integrable counterparts for an exponentially long time. Thus, they restrict how quickly solutions can become unstable.

== Statement ==
Let $H(I) + \varepsilon h(I, \theta)$ be a nearly integrable $n$ degree-of-freedom Hamiltonian, where $(I, \theta)$ are the action-angle variables. Ignoring the technical assumptions and details in the statement, Nekhoroshev estimates assert that:

$$|I(t) - I(0)| < \varepsilon^{1/(2n)}$$

for

$$|t|< \exp\left({c\left({ 1\over\varepsilon}\right)^{1/(2n)}}\right)$$

where $c$ is a complicated constant.

== See also ==
- Arnold diffusion
