= Superintegrable Hamiltonian system =

In mathematics, a superintegrable Hamiltonian system is a Hamiltonian system on a $2n$-dimensional symplectic manifold for which the following conditions hold:

(i) There exist $k>n$ independent integrals $F_i$ of motion. Their level surfaces (invariant submanifolds) form a fibered manifold $F:Z\to N=F(Z)$ over a connected open subset $N\subset\mathbb R^k$.

(ii) There exist smooth real functions $s_{ij}$ on $N$ such that the Poisson bracket of integrals of motion reads $\{F_i,F_j\}= s_{ij}\circ F$.

(iii) The matrix function $s_{ij}$ is of constant corank $m=2n-k$ on $N$.

If $k=n$, this is the case of a completely integrable Hamiltonian system. The Mishchenko-Fomenko theorem for superintegrable Hamiltonian systems generalizes the Liouville-Arnold theorem on action-angle coordinates of completely integrable Hamiltonian system as follows.

Let invariant submanifolds of a superintegrable Hamiltonian system be connected compact and mutually diffeomorphic. Then the fibered manifold $F$ is a fiber bundle in tori $T^m$. There exists an open neighbourhood $U$ of $F$ which is a trivial fiber bundle provided with the bundle (generalized action-angle) coordinates $(I_A,p_i,q^i, \phi^A)$, $A=1,\ldots, m$, $i=1,\ldots,n-m$ such that $(\phi^A)$ are coordinates on $T^m$. These coordinates are the Darboux coordinates on a symplectic manifold $U$. A Hamiltonian of a superintegrable system depends only on the action variables $I_A$ which are the Casimir functions of the coinduced Poisson structure on $F(U)$.

The Liouville-Arnold theorem for completely integrable systems and the Mishchenko-Fomenko theorem for the superintegrable ones are generalized to the case of non-compact invariant submanifolds. They are diffeomorphic to a toroidal cylinder $T^{m-r}\times\mathbb R^r$.

== See also ==
- Integrable system
- Action-angle coordinates
- Nambu mechanics
- Laplace–Runge–Lenz vector
- Fradkin tensor
