= Antonio Giorgilli =

Italian mathematical physicist

Antonio Giorgilli (born 1949) is an Italian mathematical physicist, known for his work on the perturbative theory of Hamiltonian systems with applications to studies of orbital stability for major and minor planets.

== Education and career ==
At the University of Milan, he graduated in March 1974 in physics with a Laurea thesis on normal modes for nonlinear Hamiltonian systems and then held junior academic appointments in the physics department there. He taught physics at the University of Calabria for the two academic years 1977 to 1979 and then at the University of Milan for the academic year 1978–1979. At the Computing Center of the University of Milan, he was appointed, in July 1979, Deputy Director and then, in January 1980, Technical Director, maintaining this office until March 1982. From 1983 to 1998 he served as a tenured associate professor at the University of Milan's mathematical physics group. In October 1998 he became an associate professor at the newly established University of Milan-Bicocca, where he was promoted to full professor in November 2000. In October 2005 he moved to the University of Milan's department of mathematics, as a full professor. Since november 2019 he has been retired.

In 1998 Giorgilli was an Invited Speaker of the International Congress of Mathematicians in Berlin. He is a member of Istituto Lombardo Accademia di Scienze e Lettere. The minor planet 27855 Giorgilli, discovered in 1995, is named in his honor.

== Selected publications ==
- Giorgilli, Antonio; Galgani, Luigi (1978). "Formal integrals for an autonomous Hamiltonian system near an equilibrium point". Celestial Mechanics. 17 (3): 267–280. Bibcode:1978CeMec..17..267G. doi:10.1007/BF01232832. S2CID 120526617.
- Contopoulos, George; Galgani, Luigi; Giorgilli, Antonio (1978). "On the number of isolating integrals in Hamiltonian systems". Physical Review A. 18 (3): 1183–1189. Bibcode:1978PhRvA..18.1183C. doi:10.1103/PhysRevA.18.1183.
- Benettin, Giancarlo; Galgani, Luigi; Giorgilli, Antonio; Strelcyn, Jean-Marie (1980). "Lyapunov Characteristic Exponents for smooth dynamical systems and for hamiltonian systems; a method for computing all of them. Part 1: Theory". Meccanica. 15: 9–20. doi:10.1007/BF02128236. S2CID 123085922. (This paper has been cited over 2000 times.)
- Benettin, G.; Galgani, L.; Giorgilli, A.; Strelcyn, J. -M. (1984). "A proof of Kolmogorov's theorem on invariant tori using canonical transformations defined by the Lie method". Il Nuovo Cimento B. Series 11. 79 (2): 201–223. Bibcode:1984NCimB..79..201B. doi:10.1007/BF02748972. S2CID 117101161.
- Benettin, Giancarlo; Galgani, Luigi; Giorgilli, Antonio (1985). "A proof of Nekhoroshev's theorem for the stability times in nearly integrable Hamiltonian systems". Celestial Mechanics. 37 (1): 1–25. Bibcode:1985CeMec..37....1B. doi:10.1007/BF01230338. S2CID 122317163.
  - (See Nekhoroshev estimates.)
- Giorgilli, Antonio; Delshams, Amadeo; Fontich, Ernest; Galgani, Luigi; Simó, Carles (1989). "Effective stability for a Hamiltonian system near an elliptic equilibrium point, with an application to the restricted three body problem". Journal of Differential Equations. 77 (1): 167–198. Bibcode:1989JDE....77..167G. doi:10.1016/0022-0396(89)90161-7.
- Benettin, Giancarlo; Galgani, Luigi; Giorgilli, Antonio (1989). "Realization of holonomic constraints and freezing of high frequency degrees of freedom in the light of classical perturbation theory. Part II". Communications in Mathematical Physics. 121 (4): 557–601. Bibcode:1989CMaPh.121..557B. doi:10.1007/BF01218157. S2CID 55906081.
- Celletti, Alessandra; Giorgilli, Antonio (1991). "On the stability of the Lagrangian points in the spatial restricted problem of three bodies". Celestial Mechanics and Dynamical Astronomy. 50 (1): 31–58. doi:10.1007/BF00048985. ISSN 0923-2958. S2CID 121082996.
- Benettin, Giancarlo; Giorgilli, Antonio (1994). "On the Hamiltonian interpolation of near-to-the identity symplectic mappings with application to symplectic integration algorithms". Journal of Statistical Physics. 74 (5–6): 1117–1143. Bibcode:1994JSP....74.1117B. doi:10.1007/BF02188219. S2CID 122300276.
- Morbidelli, Alessandro; Giorgilli, Antonio (1995). "Superexponential stability of KAM tori". Journal of Statistical Physics. 78 (5–6): 1607–1617. Bibcode:1995JSP....78.1607M. doi:10.1007/BF02180145. S2CID 12387488.
- Giorgilli, Antonio; Paleari, Simone; Penati, Tiziano (2012). "Extensive adiabatic invariants for nonlinear chains". Journal of Statistical Physics. 148 (6): 1106–1134. Bibcode:2012JSP...148.1106G. doi:10.1007/s10955-012-0568-9. S2CID 14358190.
- Giorgilli, Antonio; Locatelli, Ugo; Sansottera, Marco (2014). "Improved convergence estimates for the Schroder-Siegel problem". Annali di Matematica Pura ed Applicata. 194 (4): 995–1023. arXiv:1712.08927. doi:10.1007/s10231-014-0408-4. S2CID 119126857.
- Giorgilli, Antonio; Paleari, Simone; Penati, Tiziano (2015). "An extensive adiabatic invariant for the Klein-Gordon model in the thermodynamic limit". Annales Henri Poincaré. 16 (4): 897–9559. arXiv:1310.2105. Bibcode:2015AnHP...16..897G. doi:10.1007/s00023-014-0335-3. S2CID 54962090.
- Giorgilli, Antonio; Locatelli, Ugo; Sansottera, Marco (2017). "Secular dynamics of a planar model of the Sun--Jupiter--Saturn--Uranus system; effective stability into the light of Kolmogorov and Nekhoroshev theories". Regular and Chaotic Dynamics. 22 (1): 54–77. arXiv:1702.04894. Bibcode:2017RCD....22...54G. doi:10.1134/S156035471701004X. S2CID 119733412.
- Giorgilli, Antonio (2022). Notes on Hamiltonian Dynamical Systems. Cambridge University Press. doi:10.1017/9781009151122. ISBN 9781009151139. S2CID 248330439.
- Giorgilli, Antonio; Locatelli, Ugo; Sansottera, Marco (2026). Celestial Mechanics: Classical and Modern Methods. Cambridge University Press. doi:10.1017/9781009595308. ISBN 978-1009595339.
