= Fradkin tensor =

Conservation law

The Fradkin tensor, or Jauch-Hill-Fradkin tensor, named after Josef-Maria Jauch and Edward Lee Hill and David M. Fradkin, is a conservation law used in the treatment of the isotropic multidimensional harmonic oscillator in classical mechanics. For the treatment of the quantum harmonic oscillator in quantum mechanics, it is replaced by the tensor-valued Fradkin operator.

The Fradkin tensor provides enough conserved quantities to make the oscillator's equations of motion maximally superintegrable. This implies that to determine the trajectory of the system, no differential equations need to be solved, only algebraic ones.

Similarly to the Laplace–Runge–Lenz vector in the Kepler problem, the Fradkin tensor arises from a hidden symmetry of the harmonic oscillator.

== Definition ==
Suppose the Hamiltonian of a harmonic oscillator is given by

$$H = \frac{\vec p^2}{2m} + \frac{1}{2} m \omega^2 \vec x^2$$

with

- momentum $\vec p$,
- mass $m$,
- angular frequency $\omega$, and
- displacement $\vec x$,

then the Fradkin tensor (up to an arbitrary normalisation) is defined as

$$F_{ij} = \frac{p_i p_j}{2m} + \frac{1}{2} m \omega^2 x_i x_j .$$

In particular, $H$ is given by the trace: $H = \operatorname{Tr}(F)$. The Fradkin Tensor is a thus a symmetric matrix, and for an $n$-dimensional harmonic oscillator has $\tfrac{n(n+1)}{2} - 1$ independent entries, for example 5 in 3 dimensions.

== Properties ==
- The Fradkin tensor is orthogonal to the angular momentum $\vec L = \vec x \times \vec p$:
  $$F_{ij} L_j = 0$$
- contracting the Fradkin tensor with the displacement vector gives the relationship
  $$x_i F_{ij} x_j = E\vec x^2 - \frac{\vec L^2}{2m}$$.
- The 5 independent components of the Fradkin tensor and the 3 components of angular momentum give the 8 generators of $SU(3)$, the three-dimensional special unitary group in 3 dimensions, with the relationships
  $$\begin{align} \{L_i, L_j\}      &= \varepsilon_{ijk} L_k \\
\{L_i, F_{jk}\}   &= \varepsilon_{ijn} F_{nk} + \varepsilon_{ikn} F_{jn} \\
\{F_{ij},F_{kl}\} &= \frac{\omega^2}{4} \left(\delta_{ik} \varepsilon_{jln} + \delta_{il}\varepsilon_{jkn} + \delta_{jk} \varepsilon_{iln} + \delta_{jl} \varepsilon_{ikn}\right) L_n\,,\end{align}$$

where $\{\cdot,\cdot\}$ is the Poisson bracket, $\delta$ is the Kronecker delta, and $\varepsilon$ is the Levi-Civita symbol.

== Proof of conservation ==
In Hamiltonian mechanics, the time evolution of any function $A$ defined on phase space is given by

$$\frac{\mathrm dA}{\mathrm dt} = \{A,H\} = \sum_k \left(\frac{\partial A}{\partial x_k} \frac{\partial H}{\partial p_k} - \frac{\partial A}{\partial p_k} \frac{\partial H}{\partial x_k}\right) + \frac{\partial A}{\partial t}$$,

so for the Fradkin tensor of the harmonic oscillator,

$$\frac{\mathrm dF_{ij}}{\mathrm dt} = \frac{1}{2} \omega^2 \sum_k \Big((x_j \delta_{ik} + x_i \delta_{jk}) p_k - (p_j \delta_{ik} + p_i \delta_{jk}) x_k \Big) = 0 .$$.

The Fradkin tensor is the conserved quantity associated to the transformation

$$x_i \to x_i' = x_i + \frac 12 \omega^{-1} \varepsilon_{jk} \left(\dot x_j \delta_{ik} + \dot x_k \delta_{ij}\right)$$

by Noether's theorem.

== Quantum mechanics ==
In quantum mechanics, position and momentum are replaced by the position- and momentum operators and the Poisson brackets by the commutator. As such the Hamiltonian becomes the Hamiltonian operator, angular momentum the angular momentum operator, and the Fradkin tensor the Fradkin operator. All of the above properties continue to hold after making these replacements.
