= Dynamical billiards =

Idealised system for theoretical analysis

A particle moving inside the Bunimovich stadium, a well-known chaotic billiard. See § Software for making such an animation.

A dynamical billiard is a dynamical system in which a particle alternates between free motion (typically as a straight line) and specular reflections from a boundary. When the particle hits the boundary, it reflects from it without loss of speed (i.e. elastic collisions). Billiards are Hamiltonian idealizations of the game of billiards, but where the region contained by the boundary can have shapes other than rectangular and even be multidimensional. Dynamical billiards may also be studied on non-Euclidean geometries; indeed, the first studies of billiards established their ergodic motion on surfaces of constant negative curvature. The study of billiards which are kept out of a region, rather than being kept in a region, is known as outer billiard theory.

The motion of the particle in the billiard is a straight line, with constant energy, between reflections with the boundary (a geodesic if the Riemannian metric of the billiard table is not flat). All reflections are specular: the angle of reflection just after the collision is equal to the angle of incidence just before the collision. The sequence of reflections is described by the billiard map that completely characterizes the motion of the particle.

Billiards capture all the complexity of Hamiltonian systems, from integrability to chaotic motion, without the difficulties of integrating the equations of motion to determine its Poincaré map. Birkhoff showed that a billiard system with an elliptic table is integrable.

== Equations of motion ==
The Hamiltonian for a particle of mass m moving freely without friction on a surface is
$$H(p, q) = \frac{p^2}{2m} + V(q),$$
where $V(q)$ is a potential designed to be zero inside the region $\Omega$ in which the particle can move, and infinity otherwise:
$$V(q) = \begin{cases}
0,      & q \in \Omega, \\
\infty, & q \notin \Omega.
\end{cases}$$

This form of the potential guarantees a specular reflection on the boundary. The kinetic term guarantees that the particle moves in a straight line, without any change in energy. If the particle is to move on a non-Euclidean manifold, then the Hamiltonian is replaced by
$$H(p, q) = \frac{1}{2m} p^i p^j g_{ij}(q) + V(q),$$
where $g_{ij}(q)$ is the metric tensor at point $q \in \Omega$. Because of the very simple structure of this Hamiltonian, the equations of motion for the particle, the Hamilton–Jacobi equations, are nothing other than the geodesic equations on the manifold: the particle moves along geodesics.

== Notable billiards and billiard classes ==
Dynamical billiard trajectories inside an ellipse, showing three mathematical behaviors: through the focus, between the foci (creating a hyperbola envelope), and outside the foci (creating a confocal ellipse envelope).

=== Hadamard's billiards ===
Hadamard's billiards concern the motion of a free point particle on a surface of constant negative curvature, in particular, the simplest compact Riemann surface with negative curvature, a surface of genus 2 (a two-holed donut). The model is exactly solvable and is given by the geodesic flow on the surface. It is the earliest example of deterministic chaos ever studied, having been introduced by Jacques Hadamard in 1898.

=== Artin's billiard ===
Artin's billiard considers the free motion of a point particle on a surface of constant negative curvature, in particular, the simplest non-compact Riemann surface, a surface with one cusp. It is notable for being exactly solvable, and yet not only ergodic but also strongly mixing. It is an example of an Anosov system. This system was first studied by Emil Artin in 1924.

=== Triangular billiards ===
Triangular billiards is the dynamical billiards problem in a triangle. It is a major open problem in this area whether all triangles have a periodic billiards path. Solutions are known for all acute triangles, all right triangles, all obtuse triangles whose maximum angle is sufficiently small, all triangles with angles that are rational multiples of π, and all triangles sufficiently close to an isosceles triangle.

=== Dispersing and semi-dispersing billiards ===
Let M be complete smooth Riemannian manifold without boundary, maximal sectional curvature of which is not greater than K, and with the injectivity radius $\rho > 0$. Consider a collection of n geodesically convex subsets (walls) $B_i \subset M$, $i = 1, \ldots, n$, such that their boundaries are smooth submanifolds of codimension one. Let $B = M \ \big(\cup_{i=1}^n \operatorname{Int}(B_i)\big)$, where $\operatorname{Int}(B_i)$ denotes the interior of the set $B_i$. The set $B \subset M$ will be called the billiard table. Consider now a particle that moves inside the set B with unit speed along a geodesic until it reaches one of the sets B_{i} (such an event is called a collision), where it reflects according to the law “the angle of reflection is equal to the angle of incidence” (if it reaches one of the sets $B_i \cap B_j$, $i \neq j$, the trajectory is not defined after that moment). Such dynamical system is called semi-dispersing billiard. If the walls are strictly convex, then the billiard is called dispersing. The naming is motivated by observation that a locally parallel beam of trajectories disperse after a collision with strictly convex part of a wall, but remain locally parallel after a collision with a flat section of a wall.

Dispersing boundary plays the same role for billiards as negative curvature does for geodesic flows causing the exponential instability of the dynamics. It is precisely this dispersing mechanism that gives dispersing billiards their strongest chaotic properties, as it was established by Yakov G. Sinai. Namely, the billiards are ergodic, mixing, Bernoulli, having a positive Kolmogorov–Sinai entropy and an exponential decay of correlations.

Chaotic properties of general semi-dispersing billiards are not understood that well, however, those of one important type of semi-dispersing billiards, hard-ball gas were studied in some details since 1975 (see next section).

General results of Dmitri Burago and Serge Ferleger on the uniform estimation on the number of collisions in non-degenerate semi-dispersing billiards allow to establish finiteness of its topological entropy and no more than exponential growth of periodic trajectories. In contrast, degenerate semi-dispersing billiards may have infinite topological entropy.

=== Lorentz gas, a.k.a. Sinai billiard ===
A particle moving inside the Sinai billiard, also known as Lorentz gas

The table of the Lorentz gas (also known as Sinai billiard) is a square with a disk removed from its center; the table is flat, having no curvature. The billiard arises from studying the behavior of two interacting disks bouncing inside a square, reflecting off the boundaries of the square and off each other. By eliminating the center of mass as a configuration variable, the dynamics of two interacting disks reduces to the dynamics in the Sinai billiard.

The billiard was introduced by Yakov G. Sinai as an example of an interacting Hamiltonian system that displays physical thermodynamic properties: almost all (up to a measure zero) of its possible trajectories are ergodic, and it has a positive Lyapunov exponent.

Sinai's great achievement with this model was to show that the classical Boltzmann–Gibbs ensemble for an ideal gas is essentially the maximally chaotic Hadamard billiards.

=== Bouncing-ball billiard ===
A particle is subject to a constant force (e.g. the gravity of the Earth) and scatters inelastically on a periodically corrugated vibrating floor. When the floor is made of arc or circles – in a certain interval of frequencies – one can give a semi-analytic estimates to the rate of exponential separation of the trajectories.

=== Bunimovich stadium ===
The table called the Bunimovich stadium is a rectangle capped by semicircles, a shape called a stadium. Until it was introduced by Leonid Bunimovich, billiards with positive Lyapunov exponents were thought to need convex scatters, such as the disk in the Sinai billiard, to produce the exponential divergence of orbits. Bunimovich showed that by considering the orbits beyond the focusing point of a concave region, it was possible to obtain exponential divergence.

=== Magnetic billiards ===
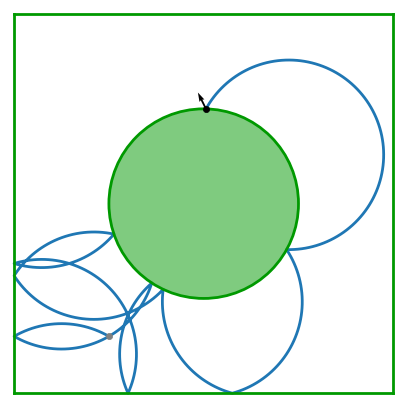
Movement of a charged particle inside a Sinai billiard with perpendicular magnetic field

Magnetic billiards represent billiards where a charged particle is propagating under the presence of a perpendicular magnetic field. As a result, the particle trajectory changes from a straight line into an arc of a circle. The radius of this circle is inversely proportional to the magnetic field strength. Such billiards have been useful in real-world applications of billiards, typically modelling nanodevices (see § Applications).

=== Generalized billiards ===
Generalized billiards (GB) describe a motion of a mass point (a particle) inside a closed domain $\Pi \subset \mathbb{R}^n$ with the piece-wise smooth boundary $\Gamma$. On the boundary $\Gamma$ the velocity of point is transformed as the particle underwent the action of generalized billiard law. GB were introduced by Lev D. Pustyl'nikov in the general case, and, in the case when $\Pi$ is a parallelepiped in connection with the justification of the second law of thermodynamics. From the physical point of view, GB describe a gas consisting of finitely many particles moving in a vessel, while the walls of the vessel heat up or cool down. The essence of the generalization is the following. As the particle hits the boundary $\Gamma$, its velocity transforms with the help of a given function $f(\gamma, t)$, defined on the direct product $\Gamma \times \mathbb{R}^1$ (where $\mathbb{R}^1$ is the real line, $\gamma \in \Gamma$ is a point of the boundary and $t \in \mathbb{R}^1$ is time), according to the following law. Suppose that the trajectory of the particle, which moves with the velocity $v$, intersects $\Gamma$ at the point $\gamma \in \Gamma$ at time $t^*$. Then at time $t^*$ the particle acquires the velocity $v^*$, as if it underwent an elastic push from the infinitely heavy plane $\Gamma^*$, which is tangent to $\Gamma$ at the point $\gamma$, and at time $t^*$ moves along the normal to $\Gamma$ at $\gamma$ with the velocity $\tfrac{\partial f}{\partial t} (\gamma, t^*)$. We emphasize that the position of the boundary itself is fixed, while its action upon the particle is defined through the function $f$.

We take the positive direction of motion of the plane $\Gamma^*$ to be towards the interior of $\Pi$. Thus if the derivative $\tfrac{\partial f}{\partial t} (\gamma, t) > 0$, then the particle accelerates after the impact. If the velocity $v^*$, acquired by the particle as the result of the above reflection law, is directed to the interior of the domain $\Pi$, then the particle will leave the boundary and continue moving in $\Pi$ until the next collision with $\Gamma$. If the velocity $v^*$ is directed towards the outside of $\Pi$, then the particle remains on $\Gamma$ at the point $\gamma$ until at some time $\tilde{t} > t^*$ the interaction with the boundary will force the particle to leave it.

If the function $f(\gamma, t)$ does not depend on time $t$; i.e., $\tfrac{\partial f}{\partial t} = 0$, the generalized billiard coincides with the classical one.

This generalized reflection law is very natural. First, it reflects an obvious fact that the walls of the vessel with gas are motionless. Second, the action of the wall on the particle is still the classical elastic push. In the essence, we consider infinitesimally moving boundaries with given velocities.

It is considered the reflection from the boundary $\Gamma$ both in the framework of classical mechanics (Newtonian case) and the theory of relativity (relativistic case).

Main results: in the Newtonian case, the energy of particle is bounded, the Gibbs entropy is a constant; and in relativistic case, the energy of particle, the Gibbs entropy, the entropy with respect to the phase volume grow to infinity.

== Quantum chaos ==
The quantum version of the billiards is readily studied in several ways. The classical Hamiltonian for the billiards, given above, is replaced by the stationary-state Schrödinger equation $H\psi = E\psi$ or, more precisely,
$$-\frac{\hbar^2}{2m} \nabla^2 \psi_n(q) = E_n \psi_n(q),$$
where $\nabla^2$ is the Laplacian. The potential that is infinite outside the region $\Omega$ but zero inside it translates to the Dirichlet boundary conditions:
$$\psi_n(q) = 0 \quad\text{for}\quad q \notin \Omega.$$

As usual, the wavefunctions are taken to be orthonormal:
$$\int_\Omega \overline{\psi_m}(q) \psi_n(q) \,dq = \delta_{mn}.$$

The free-field Schrödinger equation is the same as the Helmholtz equation:
$$(\nabla^2 + k^2)\psi = 0$$
with
$$k^2 = \frac{1}{\hbar^2} 2mE_n.$$
This implies that two- and three-dimensional quantum billiards can be modelled by the classical resonance modes of a radar cavity of a given shape, thus opening a door to experimental verification. (The study of radar cavity modes must be limited to the transverse magnetic (TM) modes, as these are the ones obeying the Dirichlet boundary conditions.)

The semi-classical limit corresponds to $\hbar \to 0$, which can be seen to be equivalent to $m \to \infty$, in other words, increasing the mass so that it behaves classically.

As a general statement, one may say that whenever the classical equations of motion are integrable (e.g. rectangular or circular billiard tables), then the quantum-mechanical version of the billiards is completely solvable. When the classical system is chaotic, then the quantum system is generally not exactly solvable and presents numerous difficulties in its quantization and evaluation. The general study of chaotic quantum systems is known as quantum chaos.

A particularly striking example of scarring on an elliptical table is given by the observation of the so-called quantum mirage.

== Applications ==
Billiards, both quantum and classical, have been applied in several areas of physics to model quite diverse real world systems. Examples include ray-optics, lasers, acoustics, optical fibers (e.g. double-clad fibers), or quantum-classical correspondence. One of their most frequent application is to model particles moving inside nanodevices, for example quantum dots, pn-junctions, antidot superlattices, among others. The reason for this broadly spread effectiveness of billiards as physical models resides on the fact that in situations with small amount of disorder or noise, the movement of e.g. particles like electrons, or light rays, is very much similar to the movement of the point-particles in billiards. In addition, the energy conserving nature of the particle collisions is a direct reflection of the energy conservation of Hamiltonian mechanics.

== Software ==
Open source software to simulate billiards exist for various programming languages. From most recent to oldest, existing software are: DynamicalBilliards.jl (Julia), Bill2D (C++) and Billiard Simulator (Matlab). The animations present on this page were done with DynamicalBilliards.jl.

== See also ==
- Fermi–Ulam model (billiards with oscillating walls)
- Lubachevsky–Stillinger algorithm of compression simulates hard spheres colliding not only with the boundaries but also among themselves while growing in sizes
- Arithmetic billiards
- Illumination problem
