= Capsule (geometry) =

Cylinder with hemispherical ends

A two-dimensional orthographic projection at the left with a three-dimensional one at the right depicting a capsule

A capsule (from Latin capsula 'small box or chest'), or stadium of revolution, is a basic three-dimensional geometric shape consisting of a cylinder with hemispherical ends. Another name for this shape is spherocylinder.

It can also be referred to as an oval although the sides (either vertical or horizontal) are straight parallel.

== Usages ==
The shape is used for some objects like containers for pressurised gases, building domes, and pharmaceutical capsules.

In chemistry and physics, this shape is used as a basic model for non-spherical particles. It appears, in particular as a model for the molecules in liquid crystals or for the particles in granular matter.

== Formulas ==
The volume $V$ of a capsule is calculated by adding the volume of a ball of radius $r$ (that accounts for the two hemispheres) to the volume of the cylindrical part. Hence, if the cylinder has height $h$,

$$V = \frac{4}{3}\pi r^3 + (\pi r^2h)= \pi r^2 \left (\frac{4}{3}r + h \right )$$.

The surface area of a capsule of radius $r$ whose cylinder part has height $h$ is $2 \pi r (2r + h)$.

== Generalization ==
A capsule can be equivalently described as the Minkowski sum of a ball of radius $r$ with a line segment of length $a$. By this description, capsules can be straightforwardly generalized as Minkowski sums of a ball with a polyhedron. The resulting shape is called a spheropolyhedron.

== Related shapes ==
A capsule is the three-dimensional shape obtained by revolving the two-dimensional stadium around the line of symmetry that bisects the semicircles.
