= Effective mass (spring–mass system) =

Parameter in physics problems

In a real spring–mass system, the spring has a non-negligible mass $m$. Since not all of the spring's length moves at the same velocity $v$ as the suspended mass $M$ (for example the point completely opposed to the mass $M$, at the other end of the spring, is not moving at all), its kinetic energy is not equal to $\frac{1}{2} m v^2$. As such, $m$ cannot be simply added to $M$ to determine the frequency of oscillation, and the effective mass of the spring, $m_\mathrm{eff}$, is defined as the mass that needs to be added to $M$ to correctly predict the behavior of the system.

== Uniform spring (homogeneous) ==
vertical spring–mass system

The effective mass of the spring in a spring–mass system when using a heavy spring (non-ideal) of uniform linear density is $\frac{1}{3}$ of the mass of the spring and is independent of the direction of the spring–mass system (i.e., horizontal, vertical, and oblique systems all have the same effective mass). This is because external acceleration does not affect the period of motion around the equilibrium point.

The effective mass of the spring can be determined by finding its kinetic energy. For a differential mass element of the spring $\mathrm{d}m$ at a position $s$ (dummy variable) moving with a speed $u(s)$, its kinetic energy is:
$$\mathrm{d}K = \tfrac{1}{2}\mathrm{d}m\, u^2$$

In order to find the spring's total kinetic energy, it requires adding all the mass elements' kinetic energy, and requires the following integral:
$$K =\int\limits_\mathrm{spring}\frac{1}{2}u^2\;\mathrm{d}m$$

If one assumes a homogeneous stretching, the spring's mass distribution is uniform, $\mathrm{d}m=\frac{m}{y}\mathrm{d}s$, where $y$ is the length of the spring at the time of measuring the speed. Hence,
$$\begin{align}
K &= \int_0^y\frac{1}{2}u^2\left(\frac{m}{y}\right)\mathrm{d}s \\
&= \frac{1}{2}\frac{m}{y}\int_0^y u^2\mathrm{d}s
\end{align}$$

The velocity of each mass element of the spring is directly proportional to length from the position where it is attached (if near to the block then more velocity, and if near to the ceiling then less velocity), i.e. $u(s)=\frac{s}{y}v$, from which it follows:

$$\begin{align}
K &= \frac{1}{2}\frac{m}{y}\int_0^y\left(\frac{s}{y}v\right)^2\mathrm{d}s \\
&= \frac{1}{2}\frac{m}{y^3}v^2\int_0^y s^2\,\mathrm{d}s \\
&= \frac{1}{2}\frac{m}{y^3}v^2\left[\frac{s^3}{3}\right]_0^y \\
&= \frac{1}{2}\frac{m}{3}v^2
\end{align}$$

Comparing to the expected original kinetic energy formula $\frac{1}{2}mv^2,$ the effective mass of spring in this case is $\frac{m}{3}$. This result is known as Rayleigh's value, after Lord Rayleigh.

To find the gravitational potential energy of the spring, one follows a similar procedure:
$$\begin{align}
U &= \int\limits_\mathrm{spring} \mathrm{d}m \, g s
= \int_0^y \frac{m}{y} g s \;\mathrm{d}s \\[1ex]
&= mg\,\frac{1}{y} \int_0^y s \;\mathrm{d}s
= mg\,\frac{1}{y} \left[\frac{s^2}{2}\right]_0^y \\[1ex]
&= \frac{m}{2}gy
\end{align}$$

Using this result, the total energy of system can be written in terms of the displacement $y$ from the spring's unstretched position (taking the upwards direction as positive, ignoring constant potential terms and setting the origin of potential energy at $y=0$):

$$\begin{align}
E &= \tfrac{1}{2} \tfrac{m}{3} v^2 + \tfrac{1}{2}M v^2 + \tfrac{1}{2} k y^2 +\tfrac{1}{2}m g y + M g y \\[1ex]
&= \tfrac{1}{2} \left(M + \tfrac{m}{3}\right) v^2 + \tfrac{1}{2} k y^2 +\left(M + \tfrac{m}{2}\right)g y
\end{align}$$

Note that $g$ here is the acceleration of gravity along the spring. By differentiation of the equation with respect to time, the equation of motion is:

$$\left( M+\frac{m}{3}\right)\ a = -ky -\left(M+\frac{m}{2}\right)g$$

The equilibrium point $y_\mathrm{eq}$ can be found by letting the acceleration be zero:

$$y_\mathrm{eq} = -\frac{\left(M+\frac{m}{2}\right)g}{k}$$

Defining $\bar{y} = y - y_\mathrm{eq}$, the equation of motion becomes:

$$\left( M+\frac{m}{3} \right) \ a = -k\bar{y} = -k(y - y_\mathrm{eq})$$

This is the equation for a simple harmonic oscillator with angular frequency:
$$\omega= \sqrt{\frac{k}{M + \frac{m}{3}}\,}$$
Thus, it has a smaller angular frequency than in the ideal spring. Also, its period is given by:
$$T= 2\pi \sqrt{\frac{M + \frac{m}{3}}{k}\,}$$
Which is bigger than the ideal spring. Both formulae reduce to the ideal case in the limit $\frac{m}{M} \to 0$.

So the effective mass of the spring added to the mass of the load gives us the "effective total mass" of the system that must be used in the standard formula $2\pi\sqrt{\frac{m}{k}}$ to determine the period of oscillation.

Finally, the solution to the initial value problem:
$$\left\{ \begin{matrix} \ddot{y} & = & -\omega^2(y-y_\mathrm{eq}) \\ \dot{y}(0) & = & \dot{y}_0 \\ y(0) & = & y_0 \end{matrix}\right.$$
Is given by:
$$y(t) = (y_0-y_\text{eq})\cos(\omega t) + \frac{\dot{y}_0}{\omega}\sin(\omega t) + y_\text{eq}$$
Which is a simple harmonic motion.

== General case ==
As seen above, the effective mass of a spring does not depend upon "external" factors such as the acceleration of gravity along it. In fact, for a non-uniform heavy spring, the effective mass solely depends on its linear density $\lambda(s)$ along its length:

$$\begin{align}
K &= \int\limits_\mathrm{spring}\frac{1}{2}u^2\;\mathrm{d}m \\
&= \int_0^y\frac{1}{2}u^2\!(s)\, \lambda(s) \;\mathrm{d}s \\
&= \int_0^y\frac{1}{2}\left(\frac{s}{y}v \right)^2 \lambda(s) \;\mathrm{d}s \\
&= \frac{1}{2} \left( \int_0^y \frac{s^2}{y^2} \lambda(s) \;\mathrm{d}s \right) v^2
\end{align}$$

So the effective mass of a spring is:

$$m_{\mathrm{eff}} = \int_0^y \frac{s^2}{y^2} \lambda(s) \,\mathrm{d}s$$

This result also shows that $m_\mathrm{eff} \leqslant m$, with $m_\mathrm{eff} = m$ occurring in the case of an unphysical spring whose mass is located purely at the end farthest from the support.

Three special cases can be considered:

- $\lambda(s)=0$ is the idealised case where the spring has no mass, and $m_\mathrm{eff}=m=0$.
- $\lambda(s)=\frac{m}{y}$ is the homogeneous case (uniform spring) where Rayleigh's value appears in the equation, i.e., $m_\mathrm{eff}=\frac{m}{3}$.
- $\lambda(s)=m\,\delta(s-y)$, where $\delta(x)$ is Dirac delta function, is the extreme case when all the mass is located at $s=y$, resulting in $m_\mathrm{eff}=m$.

To find the corresponding Lagrangian, one must find beforehand the potential gravitational energy of the spring:
$$\begin{align}
U &= \int\limits_\mathrm{spring} \mathrm{d}m\, g\, s \\
&= \int_0^y \lambda(s)\, g\, s \;\mathrm{d}s \\
&= \left( \int_0^y \frac{s}{y} \lambda(s) \;\mathrm{d}s \right) g\, y
\end{align}$$

Due to the monotonicity of the integral, it follows that:
$$0 \leqslant m_\mathrm{eff} = \int_0^y \frac{s^2}{y^2} \lambda(s) \;\mathrm{d}s \leqslant \int_0^y \frac{s}{y} \lambda(s) \;\mathrm{d}s \leqslant \int_0^y \lambda(s) \;\mathrm{d}s = m$$

With the Lagrangian being:
$$\mathcal{L}(y,\dot{y}) = \frac{1}{2} \left( M+\int_0^y \frac{s^2}{y^2} \lambda(s) \;\mathrm{d}s \right) \dot{y}^2 - \frac{1}{2}ky^2 -\left( M+\int_0^y \frac{s}{y} \lambda(s) \;\mathrm{d}s \right) g\, y$$

== Real spring ==
The above calculations assume that the stiffness coefficient of the spring does not depend on its length. However, this is not the case for real springs. For small values of $\frac{M}{m}$, the displacement is not so large as to cause elastic deformation. In fact for $\frac{M}{m}\ll 1$, the effective mass is $m_\mathrm{eff}=\frac{4}{\pi^2}m$. Jun-ichi Ueda and Yoshiro Sadamoto have found that as $\frac{M}{m}$ increases beyond $7$, the effective mass of a spring in a vertical spring-mass system becomes smaller than Rayleigh's value $\frac{m}{3}$ and eventually reaches negative values at about $\frac{M}{m}\approx 38$. This unexpected behavior of the effective mass can be explained in terms of the elastic after-effect (which is the spring's not returning to its original length after the load is removed).

== Comparison with pendulum ==
Consider the pendulum differential equation:

$$\ddot{\theta}+{\omega_0}^2\sin\theta=0$$

Where $\omega_0$ is the natural frequency of oscillations (and the angular frequency for small oscillations). The parameter ${\omega_0}^2$ stands for $\frac{g}{\ell}$ in an ideal pendulum, and $\frac{mgr_\mathrm{CM}}{I_O}$ in a compound pendulum, where $\ell$ is the length of the pendulum, $m$ is the total mass of the system, $r_\mathrm{CM}$ is the distance from the pivot point $O$ (the point the pendulum is suspended from) to the pendulum's centre-of-mass, and $I_O$ is the moment of inertia of the system with respect to an axis that goes through the pivot.

Consider a system made of a homogeneous rod swinging from one end, and having attached bob at the other end. Let $\ell$ be the length of the rod, $m_\mathrm{rod}$ the mass of the rod, and $m_\mathrm{bob}$ the mass of the bob, thus the linear density is given by $\lambda(s) = m_\mathrm{bob}\delta(s-\ell)+\frac{m_\mathrm{rod}}{\ell}$, with $\delta(\cdot)$ Dirac's delta function. The total mass of the system is $m_\mathrm{bob}+m_\mathrm{rod}$. To find out $r_\mathrm{CM}$ one must solve $(m_\mathrm{bob}+m_\mathrm{rod})r_\mathrm{CM}= m_\mathrm{bob}\ell+m_\mathrm{rod}\frac{\ell}{2}$ by definition of centre-of-mass (this would be an integral equation in the general case, $\int_0^\ell \lambda(s)\,\big(s-r_\mathrm{CM})\;\mathrm{d}s = 0$, but it simplifies to this in the homogeneous case), whose solution is give by $r_\mathrm{CM}=\frac{m_\mathrm{bob}+\frac{1}{2}m_\mathrm{rod}}{m_\mathrm{bob}+m_\mathrm{rod}}\ell$. The moment of inertia of the system is the sum of the two moments of inertia, $I_O=m_\mathrm{bob}\ell^2+\frac{1}{3}m_\mathrm{rod}\ell^2$ (once again in the general case the integral equation would be $I_O=\int_0^\ell \lambda(s)\,s^2\;\mathrm{d}s$). Thus the expression can be simplified:

$${\omega_0}^2 = \frac{mgr_\mathrm{CM}}{I_O}=\frac{\left(m_\mathrm{bob}\ell+m_\mathrm{rod}\frac{\ell}{2}\right)g}{m_\mathrm{bob}\ell^2+\frac{1}{3}m_\mathrm{rod}\ell^2} = \frac{g}{\ell} \frac{m_\mathrm{bob}+\frac{m_\mathrm{rod}}{2}}{m_\mathrm{bob}+\frac{m_\mathrm{rod}}{3}} = \frac{g}{\ell} \frac{1+\frac{m_\mathrm{rod}}{2m_\mathrm{bob}}}{1+\frac{m_\mathrm{rod}}{3m_\mathrm{bob}}}$$

Notice how the final expression is not a function on both the mass of the bob, $m_\mathrm{bob}$, and the mass of the rod, $m_\mathrm{rod}$, but only on their ratio,$\frac{m_\mathrm{rod}}{m_\mathrm{bob}}$. Also notice that initially it has the same structure as the spring–mass system: the product of the ideal case and a correction (with Rayleigh's value). Notice that for $\frac{m_\mathrm{rod}}{m_\mathrm{bob}}\ll1$, the last correction term can be approximated by:

$$\frac{1+\frac{m_\mathrm{rod}}{2m_\mathrm{bob}}}{1+\frac{m_\mathrm{rod}}{3m_\mathrm{bob}}} \approx 1 + \frac{1}{6}\frac{m_\mathrm{rod}}{m_\mathrm{bob}} - \frac{1}{18}\left(\frac{m_\mathrm{rod}}{m_\mathrm{bob}}\right)^2 + \cdots$$

Let's compare both results:

- For the spring–mass system:
  $${\omega_0}^2 = \underbrace{\frac{k}{m_\mathrm{bob}}}_\text{Ideal case} \underbrace{\frac{1}{1+\frac{1}{3}\frac{m_\mathrm{spring}}{m_\mathrm{bob}}}}_{\text{Correction with Rayleigh's value}}$$
- For the pendulum:
  $${\omega_0}^2 = \underbrace{\frac{g}{\ell}}_\text{Ideal case} \underbrace{\frac{1}{1+\frac{1}{3}\frac{m_\mathrm{rod}}{m_\mathrm{bob}}}}_{\text{Correction with Rayleigh's value}} \underbrace{\left(1+\frac{1}{2}\frac{m_\mathrm{rod}}{m_\mathrm{bob}}\right)}_{\text{Rest of the correction}}$$

== See also ==
- Simple harmonic motion (SHM) examples.
- Reduced mass
