= Leonid Bunimovich =

Soviet and American mathematician

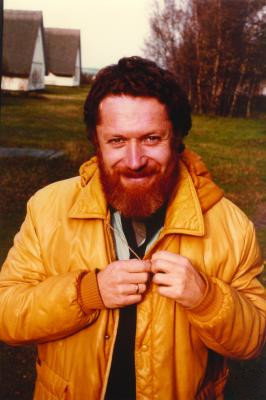
- Leonid Bunimovich in 1981 (photo from MFO)
- Education: Moscow State University (1967)

Leonid Abramowich Bunimovich (born August 1, 1947) is a Soviet and American mathematician, who made fundamental contributions to the theory of Dynamical Systems, Statistical Physics and various applications. Bunimovich received his bachelor's degree in 1967, master's degree in 1969 and PhD in 1973 from the University of Moscow. His masters and PhD thesis advisor was Yakov G. Sinai. In 1986 (after Perestroika started) he received Doctor of Sciences degree in "Theoretical and Mathematical Physics" from Institute of Theoretical Physics. Bunimovich is a Regents' Professor of Mathematics at the Georgia Institute of Technology. In 1990-91 Bunimovich was Volkswagen Professor of Physics in the Bielefeld University, he is a Fellow of the Institute of Physics and awarded Humboldt Prize in Physics.

== Biography ==
His Master's proved that some classes of quadratic maps of an interval have an absolutely continuous invariant measure and strong stochastic properties.

Bunimovich is mostly known for discovery of a fundamental mechanism of chaos in dynamical systems called the mechanism of defocusing. This discovery came as a striking surprise not only to mathematics but to physics community as well. Physicists could not believe that such (physical!) phenomenon is possible (even though a rigorous mathematical proof was provided) until they conducted massive numerical experiments. The most famous class of chaotic dynamical systems of this type, dynamical billiards are focusing chaotic billiards such as the Bunimovich stadium ("Bunimovich flowers", elliptic flowers, etc.). Later Bunimovich proved that his mechanism of defocusing works in all dimensions despite the phenomenon of astigmatism. Bunimovich introduced absolutely focusing mirrors, which is a new notion in geometric optics, and proved that only such mirrors could be focusing parts of chaotic billiards. He also constructed so called Bunimovich mushrooms, which are visual examples of billiards with mixed regular and chaotic dynamics. Physical realizations of Bunimovich stadia have been constructed for both classical and quantum investigations.

Although the discovery of defocusing mechanism was just a part of Bunimovich's PhD thesis, he could not find any job after finishing graduate school thanks to antisemitic policies in the Soviet Union. Bunimovich was unable to ever find work as a mathematician in the Soviet Union. Moreover, while finally finding a work place he was not allowed to publish mathematical papers because in the places where he worked, authorities refused to confirm that his mathematical papers contain no state secrets. Likewise for a long time he could not attend mathematical conferences even in the Soviet Union. However, although being trained as a pure mathematician, Bunimovich turned out to be able to work in applications to biomedical studies and in oceanology.

Notably, Bunimovich introduced and investigated hierarchical models of human populations, which allowed to clarify laws of distribution of hereditary diseases and explain data on migration in industrial parts of developed countries. He realized and demonstrated that the lengths of remissions in schizophrenia form a Markov process, i.e. that a length of remission depends only upon the length of the previous remission. Besides he demonstrated that among the types of attacks in schizophrenia there are those which more (or less) likely to occur after the other types of attacks. Before it was just known that the same type of attack will basically always happen.

Bunimovich discovered traps for internal waves in non-homogeneous stratified fluids and analyzed their dynamics in such traps which in particular allowed to explain some surprising observations on internal waves in the oceans.

One of the most fundamental problems in Statistical Physics is to derive Deterministic time-irreversible macro-dynamics from deterministic time-reversible Newtonian micro-dynamics. This problem, which was considered before to be mathematically non-tractable was settled in the paper by Bunimovich with Ya.G. Sinai for diffusion of mass in periodic Lorentz gas. In their previous paper was constructed the first infinite Markov partition for chaotic systems with singularities which allowed to transform this deterministic problem into probabilistic one. Then in Bunimovich's paper with H.Spohn diffusion of shear and bulk viscosities in deterministic periodic fluid was rigorously derived.

The paper by Bunimovich with Ya.G. Sinai pioneered rigorous studies of the space-time chaos. There were even no exact definition of this widely observed in experiments phenomenon. In this paper such definition was given and it was proved that space-time chaos gets realized in weakly interacting time-chaotic systems.

Together with Ben Webb Bunimovich introduced and developed the theory of Isospectral transformations for analysis of multi-dimensional systems and networks. This approach allows to obtain various types of visualization of networks as well to uncover their hierarchical structure and hidden symmetries.

It was a general consensus for centuries that only infinite time results and predictions for random systems and for deterministic systems with complex(chaotic) behavior are possible. Bunimovich discovered and rigorously proved that it is not true and developed a theory of Finite-time dynamics and finite-time predictions for strongly chaotic and random systems.

Together with Skums and Khudyakov Bunimovich discovered phenomenon of local immunodeficiency which demonstrates how viruses can cooperate to overcome an immune response of a human organism. It allowed to clarify numerous unexplained phenomena in evolution of the Hepatitis C and serves as new tool to study any disease with cross-immunoreactivity.
