= Action-angle coordinates =

Method of solution for certain mechanical problems

In classical mechanics, action-angle variables are a set of canonical coordinates that are useful in characterizing the nature of commuting flows in integrable systems when the conserved energy level set is compact, and the commuting flows are complete. Action-angle variables are also important in obtaining the frequencies of oscillatory or rotational motion without solving the equations of motion. They only exist, providing a key characterization of the dynamics, when the system is completely integrable, i.e., the number of independent Poisson commuting invariants is maximal and the conserved energy surface is compact. This is usually of practical calculational value when the Hamilton–Jacobi equation is completely separable, and the separation constants can be solved for, as functions on the phase space. Action-angle variables define a foliation by invariant Lagrangian tori because the flows induced by the Poisson commuting invariants remain within their joint level sets, while the compactness of the energy level set implies they are tori. The angle variables provide coordinates on the leaves in which the commuting flows are linear.

The connection between classical Hamiltonian systems and their quantization in the Schrödinger wave mechanics approach is made clear by viewing the Hamilton–Jacobi equation as the leading order term in the WKB asymptotic series for the Schrodinger equation. In the case of integrable systems, the Bohr–Sommerfeld quantization conditions were first used, before the advent of quantum mechanics, to compute the spectrum of the hydrogen atom. They require that the action-angle variables exist, and that they be integer multiples of the reduced Planck constant $\hbar$. Einstein's insight in the EBK quantization into the difficulty of quantizing non-integrable systems was based on this fact.

Action-angle coordinates are also useful in perturbation theory of Hamiltonian mechanics, especially in determining adiabatic invariants. One of the earliest results from chaos theory, for dynamical stability of integrable dynamical systems under small perturbations, is the KAM theorem, which states that the invariant tori are partially stable.

In the modern theory of integrable systems action-angle variables were used in the solution of the Toda lattice, the definition of Lax pairs, or more generally, isospectral evolution of a linear operator characterizing integrable dynamics, and interpreting the associated spectral data as action-angle variables in the Hamiltonian formulation.

== Derivation ==
Action angles result from a type-2 canonical transformation where the generating function is Hamilton's characteristic function $W(\mathbf{q})$ (not Hamilton's principal function $S$). Since the original Hamiltonian does not depend on time explicitly, the new Hamiltonian $K(\mathbf{w}, \mathbf{J})$ is merely the old Hamiltonian $H(\mathbf{q}, \mathbf{p})$ expressed in terms of the new canonical coordinates, which we denote as $\mathbf{w}$ (the action angles, which are the generalized coordinates) and their new generalized momenta $\mathbf{J}$. We will not need to solve here for the generating function $W$ itself; instead, we will use it merely as a vehicle for relating the new and old canonical coordinates.

Rather than defining the action angles $\mathbf{w}$ directly, we define instead their generalized momenta, which resemble the classical action for each original generalized coordinate

$$J_{k} \equiv \oint p_k \, \mathrm{d}q_k$$

where the integration path is implicitly given by the constant energy function $E=E(q_k,p_k)$. Since the actual motion is not involved in this integration, these generalized momenta $J_k$ are constants of the motion, implying that the transformed Hamiltonian $K$ does not depend on the conjugate generalized coordinates $w_k$

$$\frac{\mathrm{d}}{\mathrm{d}t} J_{k} = 0 = \frac{\partial K}{\partial w_k}$$

where the $w_k$ are given by the typical equation for a type-2 canonical transformation

$$w_k \equiv \frac{\partial W}{\partial J_k}$$

Hence, the new Hamiltonian $K=K(\mathbf{J})$ depends only on the new generalized momenta $\mathbf{J}$.

The dynamics of the action angles is given by Hamilton's equations

$$\frac{\mathrm{d}}{\mathrm{d}t} w_k = \frac{\partial K}{\partial J_k} \equiv \nu_k(\mathbf{J})$$

The right-hand side is a constant of the motion (since all the $J$s are). Hence, the solution is given by

$$w_k = \nu_k(\mathbf{J}) t + \beta_k$$

where $\beta_k$ is a constant of integration. In particular, if the original generalized coordinate undergoes an oscillation or rotation of period $T$, the corresponding action angle $w_k$ changes by $\Delta w_k = \nu_k (\mathbf{J}) T$.

These $\nu_k(\mathbf{J})$ are the frequencies of oscillation/rotation for the original generalized coordinates $q_k$. To show this, we integrate the net change in the action angle $w_k$ over exactly one complete variation (i.e., oscillation or rotation) of its generalized coordinates $q_k$

$$\Delta w_k \equiv \oint \frac{\partial w_k}{\partial q_k} \, \mathrm{d}q_k =
\oint \frac{\partial^2 W}{\partial J_k \, \partial q_k} \, \mathrm{d}q_k =
\frac{\mathrm{d}}{\mathrm{d}J_k} \oint \frac{\partial W}{\partial q_k} \, \mathrm{d}q_k =
\frac{\mathrm{d}}{\mathrm{d}J_k} \oint p_k \, \mathrm{d}q_k = \frac{\mathrm{d}J_k}{\mathrm{d}J_k} = 1$$

Setting the two expressions for $\Delta w_{k}$ equal, we obtain the desired equation

$$\nu_k(\mathbf{J}) = \frac{1}{T}$$

The action angles $\mathbf{w}$ are an independent set of generalized coordinates. Thus, in the general case, each original generalized coordinate $q_{k}$ can be expressed as a Fourier series in all the action angles

$$q_k = \sum_{s_1=-\infty}^\infty \sum_{s_2 = -\infty}^\infty \cdots \sum_{s_N = -\infty}^\infty A^k_{s_1, s_2, \ldots, s_N} e^{i2\pi s_1 w_1} e^{i2\pi s_2 w_2} \cdots e^{i2\pi s_N w_N}$$

where $A^k_{s_1, s_2, \ldots, s_N}$ is the Fourier series coefficient. In most practical cases, however, an original generalized coordinate $q_k$ will be expressible as a Fourier series in only its own action angles $w_k$

$$q_k = \sum_{s_k=-\infty}^\infty A^k_{s_k} e^{i2\pi s_k w_k}$$

== Summary of basic protocol ==
The general procedure has three steps:

1. Calculate the new generalized momenta $J_{k}$
2. Express the original Hamiltonian entirely in terms of these variables.
3. Take the derivatives of the Hamiltonian with respect to these momenta to obtain the frequencies $\nu_k$

== Degeneracy ==
In some cases, the frequencies of two different generalized coordinates are identical, i.e., $\nu_k = \nu_l$ for $k \neq l$. In such cases, the motion is called degenerate.

Degenerate motion signals that there are additional general conserved quantities; for example, the frequencies of the Kepler problem are degenerate, corresponding to the conservation of the Laplace–Runge–Lenz vector.

Degenerate motion also signals that the Hamilton–Jacobi equations are completely separable in more than one coordinate system; for example, the Kepler problem is completely separable in both spherical coordinates and parabolic coordinates.

== See also ==
- Bohr–Sommerfeld model
- Integrable system
- Einstein–Brillouin–Keller method
- Superintegrable Hamiltonian system
- Tautological one-form
