= History of variational principles in physics =

Variational principles for classical mechanics was developed in parallel with Newtonian mechanics.

In physics, a variational principle is a method for describing the state or dynamics of a physical system, by identifying it as a stationary point (minimum, maximum or saddle point) of a functional. Variational methods are exploited in many modern software applications to simulate matter and light.

Since the development of analytical mechanics in the 18th century, the fundamental equations of physics can be expressed in terms of action principles, where the variational principle is applied to the action of a system in order to recover the fundamental equation of motion. Intuitively, instead of writing out the laws of motion in terms of local, instantaneous relationships using a differential equation, the same motions can be described as minimising some total cost.

This article describes the historical development of such action principles and other variational methods applied in physics. See History of physics for an overview and Outline of the history of physics for related histories.

== Antiquity ==
Variational principles are found among earlier ideas in surveying and optics. The rope stretchers of ancient Egypt stretched corded ropes between two points to measure the path which minimized the distance of separation, and Claudius Ptolemy, in his Geographia (Bk 1, Ch 2), emphasized that one must correct for "deviations from a straight course"; in ancient Greece Euclid states in his Catoptrica that, for the path of light reflecting from a mirror, the angle of incidence equals the angle of reflection; and Hero of Alexandria later showed that this path was the shortest length and least time.

== Early variational principles ==
=== Principle of least time ===
The earlier geometrical ideas in optics were generalized by Pierre de Fermat, who in the 1660s refined the principle to "light travels between two given points along the path of shortest time"; now known as the principle of least time or Fermat's principle. Fermat showed that principle predicts the observed law of refraction. His approach was metaphysical, arguing that Nature acts simply and economically.

=== Principle of virtual work ===
In the static analysis of objects under forces but fixed at mechanical equilibrium, the principle of virtual work imagines tiny mathematical shifts away from equilibrium. Each shift does work—energy lost or gained—against the forces, but the sum of all these bits of virtual work must be zero. This principle was developed by Johann Bernoulli in a letter to Pierre Varignon in 1715, but never separately published. Cornelius Lanczos uses a slightly different definition as the single postulate for all analytic mechanics, showing thereby the power of energy based variational principles over Newtonian mechanics.

=== D'Alembert's principle ===
In 1743 Jean le Rond d'Alembert generalized the concept we now call virtual work to dynamical systems with rigid constraints, like rods or string under tension, a form that became known as the d'Alembert principle. In the case of static (in equilibrium) rigid bodies without friction, the principle of virtual work says the net work of all applied forces ($F_i^{(a)}$) under variation of positions ($r_i$) is zero:

$$\Sigma_i F_i^{(a)} \cdot \delta r_i = 0$$

A similar condition but valid for dynamics (systems in motion) introduces, for each force, the change in momentum $\dot{p}_i$:

$$\Sigma_i (F_i -\dot{p}_i)  \cdot \delta r_i = 0$$

which is d'Alembert's principle.

=== Brachistochrone problem ===
The brachistochrone problem. The path of the least time shown in red.

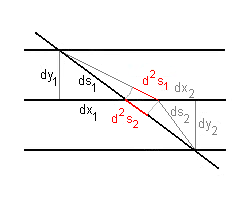
Techniques based on small variations in the path of motion grew out of analysis of the brachistochrone problem.

In 1696 Johann Bernoulli posed a puzzle to European mathematicians: derive a curve for motion of a frictionless bead falling between a higher and a lower point in the least possible time. He named the curve the "brachistochrone", (from brachystos, "shortest", and chronos, "time") Isaac Newton, Gottfried Wilhelm Leibniz and others contributed solutions, and in 1718 Johann Bernoulli published an analysis based on the solution created by his brother James Bernoulli. All of these works, especially the approach taken by the Bernoullis, involved reasoning about small deviations in the path taken by the falling bead. Thus this became the first application of the variational technique, albeit as a special-case rather than a general principle.

=== Principle of least action ===
In 1744 and 1746, Pierre Louis Maupertuis generalized Fermat's concept to mechanics, in the form of a principle of least action. Maupertuis argued metaphysically, he felt that "Nature is thrifty in all its actions", and applied the principle broadly:

The laws of movement and of rest deduced from this principle being precisely the same as those observed in nature, we can admire the application of it to all phenomena. The movement of animals, the vegetative growth of plants ... are only its consequences; and the spectacle of the universe becomes so much the grander, so much more beautiful, the worthier of its Author, when one knows that a small number of laws, most wisely established, suffice for all movements.

— Pierre Louis Maupertuis

This notion of Maupertuis, although somewhat deterministic today, does capture much of the essence of variational mechanics.

In application to physics, Maupertuis suggested that the quantity to be minimized was the product of the duration (time) of movement within a system by the action; his definitions of action varied with the problems he discussed. One form he used was called "vis viva",

Maupertuis' principle

$\delta \int 2T(t) dt=0$

which is the integral of twice what we now call the kinetic energy T of the system.

=== Euler's refinement ===
Leonhard Euler corresponded with Maupertuis from 1740 to 1744; in 1744 Euler proposed a refined formulation of the least action principle in 1744. In modern notation, Euler proposed a principle based on the abbreviated action:

Euler's principle

$\delta\int p\,dq=0$

In rather general terms he wrote that "Since the fabric of the Universe is most perfect and is the work of a most wise Creator, nothing whatsoever takes place in the Universe in which some relation of maximum and minimum does not appear."

Euler continued to write on the topic; in his Reflexions sur quelques loix generales de la nature (1748), he called the quantity "effort". His expression corresponds to what we would now call potential energy, so that his statement of least action in statics is equivalent to the principle that a system of bodies at rest will adopt a configuration that minimizes total potential energy.

=== Lagrangian mechanics ===
The first use of the term "method of variations" came in 1755 through the work of a young Joseph Louis Lagrange; Euler presented Lagrange's approach to the Berlin Academy in 1756 as the "calculus of variations". Unlike Euler, Lagrange's approach was purely analytic rather than geometrical. Lagrange introduced the idea of variation of entire curves or paths between the endpoints than of individual coordinates. For this he introduced a new form of a differential, written $\delta$, that acts on integrals rather than $d$ acting on coordinates. His notation continues to be used today.

=== Hamilton-Jacobi mechanics ===
The variational principle was not used to derive the equations of motion until almost 75 years later, when William Rowan Hamilton in 1834 and 1835 applied the variational principle to the Lagrangian function $L=T-V$ (where T is the kinetic energy and V the potential energy of an object) to obtain what are now called the Euler–Lagrange equations. Hamilton believed his results were constrained by conservation of energy, which he called conservation of living force.

While few German scientists read English papers in this era, in 1836 the German mathematician Carl Gustav Jacobi read of Hamilton's work and immediately began new mathematical work, publishing ground breaking work on the variational principle in the following year. Among Jacobi's results was the extension of Hamilton's method to time-dependent potentials (or "force functions" as they were known at that time).

=== Extensions by Gauss and Hertz ===
Other extremal principles of classical mechanics were formulated, such as Carl Friedrich Gauss's 1829 principle of least constraint and its corollary, Heinrich Hertz's 1896 principle of least curvature.

== Action principle names ==
Action principles were developed by trial and error over three centuries; the names of the principles are not self-describing. Richard Feynman, through his PhD thesis and later through his reinvention of the undergraduate physics course, reinvigorated the field of variational principles in physics. In the process he upended the terminology. Feynman called Hamilton's principal function simply the "action" and Hamilton's principle he called "the principle of least action". The table below summarizes the key terminology found in modern physics literature.

Action principle terminology
action			principle		
definition	historical name	modern name	definition	common name	Alternative name
$S = \int_{t_1}^{t_2} L\ dt$	Hamilton's principal function	action	$(\delta S)_T = 0$	Hamilton's principle	Least action, Stationary action
$W = \int_{x_1}^{x_2} mv\ ds$	action	abbreviated or Maupertuis action	$(\delta W)_E = 0$	Maupertuis's principle	Least action

The notation $(\delta S)_T = 0$ means variations on $S$ with $T = t_2 - t_1$ fixed; $(\delta W)_E$ means variation with constant energy. The abbreviated action is sometimes labeled $S_0$. Some authors use "stationary action" or "least action" to mean any variational principle involving action.

== Modern action principles ==
=== In relativity ===
In 1915 David Hilbert applied variational principles to derive the gravitational field equations of general relativity in agreement with Albert Einstein's derivation. (Einstein and Hilbert discussed Einstein's work on general relativity in person and letters throughout 1915.) Hilbert's approach required accepting the variational principle as "axiomatic", a broadly accepted requirement today but questionable to the physicists of 1915. Hilbert's variations were based on what became known as the Einstein–Hilbert action, given by

$$\mathcal{S}[g] =\frac{1}{2\kappa}\int  R \sqrt{-g} \, \mathrm{d}^4 x$$,

where κ is Einstein gravitational constant, $g=\det(g_{\alpha\beta})$ is the determinant of a spacetime Lorentz metric and $R$ is the scalar curvature.

=== In quantum mechanics ===
Variational principles played decisive roles at critical times in the development of quantum mechanics.

==== Sommerfeld's atom ====
Following Max Planck's proposal that quantum radiators explain the blackbody radiation spectrum and Albert Einstein hypothesis of quantum radiation to explain the photoelectric effect, Niels Bohr proposed quantized energy levels for the orbits in his model of the atom, thereby explaining the Balmer series for absorption of radiation by atoms. However this hypothesis involved no mechanical model. Arnold Sommerfeld then showed that quantization of the action of orbits for Hydrogen predicted the Balmer series, complete with relativistic corrections leading to fine structure in spectral lines. However, this approach could not be extended to atoms with more electrons and, more fundamentally, the quantum hypothesis itself had no explanation from this classical mechanics solution.

==== Schrödinger's equation ====
Combining Einstein's relativity and photoelectric effect results, De Broglie suggested that Sommerfeld's quantized action may relate to quantized wave effects; Erwin Schrödinger took up this idea, applying Hamilton's optico-mechanical analogy to connect the quantized action to Hamilton-Jacobi equations for the action. Hamilton's connection between light rays and light waves now became a connection between matter trajectories and de Broglie matter waves. The resulting Schrödinger equation became the first successful quantum mechanics.

==== Dirac's quantum action ====
The work that built on Schrödinger's equation relied on analogies to Hamiltonian mechanics. In 1933 Paul Dirac published a paper seeking an alternative formulation based on Lagrangian mechanics. He was motivated by the power of the action principle and the relativistic invariance of the action itself. Dirac was able to show that the wavefunctions probability amplitude at $x_1, t_2$ was related to the amplitude at $x_2, t_2$ through a complex exponential function of the action.

==== Feynman's least action mechanics ====
In 1942, nearly a decade after Dirac's work, Richard Feynman built a new quantum mechanics formulation on the action principle. Feynman interpreted Dirac's formula as a physical recipe for the probability amplitude contributions from every possible path between $x_1, t_2$ and $x_2, t_2$. These possibilities interfere; constructive interference gives the paths with the most amplitude. In the classical limit with large values of action compared to $h$, the single classical path given by the action principle results.

==== Schwinger's quantum action principle ====
In 1950, Julian Schwinger revisited Dirac's Lagrangian paper to develop the action principle in a different direction. Unlike Feynman's focus on paths, Schwinger's approach was "differential" or local.

=== In particle physics ===
The Standard Model is defined in terms of a Lagrangian density that includes all known elementary particles, the Higgs field and three of the fundamental interactions (electromagnetism, weak interaction and strong interaction, not including gravitational interaction). Its formulation started in the 1970s and has successfully explained almost all experimental results related to microscopic physics.

== Teleology in action principles ==
The breadth of physical phenomena subject to study by action principles lead scientists from all centuries to view these concepts as especially fundamental; the connection of two points by paths lead some to suggest a "purpose" to the selection of one particular path. This teleological viewpoint runs from the earliest physics through Fermat, Maupertuis, and on up to Max Planck, without, however, any scientific backing. The use of colorful language continues in the modern era with phrases like "Nature's command (to) Explore all paths!" or "It isn't that a particle takes the path of least action but that it smells all the paths in the neighborhood...".

== Variational methods ==
=== Ritz's work on elasticity and waves ===
Lord Rayleigh was the first to popularly adapt the variational principles for the search of eigenvalues and eigenvectors for the study of elasticity and classical waves in his 1877 Theory of Sound. The Rayleigh method allows approximation of the fundamental frequencies without full knowledge of the material composition and without the requirement of computational power. From 1903 to 1908, Walther Ritz introduced a series of improved methods for static and free vibration problems based on the optimization of an ansatz or trial function. Ritz demonstrated his use in the Euler–Bernoulli beam theory and the determination of Chladni figures.

For years, Ritz works were poorly cited in Western Europe and would only become popular after Ritz death in 1909. In Russia, physicists like Ivan Bubnov (in 1913) and Boris Galerkin (in 1915) would rediscover and popularize some of Ritz's methods from 1908. In 1940, Georgii I. Petrov improved these approximations. These methods are now known under different names, including Bubnov–Galerkin, Petrov–Galerkin and Ritz–Galerkin methods.

In 1911, Rayleigh complemented Ritz for his method for solving Chladni's problem, but complained for the lack of citation of his earlier work. However the similarity between Rayleigh's and Ritz's method has sometimes been challenged. Ritz's methods are sometimes referred as Rayleigh–Ritz method or simply Ritz method, depending on the procedure. Ritz's method led to the development of finite element method for the numerical solution of partial differential equations in physics.

=== For quantum systems ===
The variational method of Ritz would found his use quantum mechanics with the development of Hellmann–Feynman theorem. The theorem was first discussed by Schrödinger in 1926, the first proof was given by Paul Güttinger in 1932, and later rediscovered independently by Wolfgang Pauli and Hans Hellmann in 1933, and by Feynman in 1939.

In quantum chemistry and condensed matter physics, variational methods were developed to study atoms, molecules, nuclei and solids under a quantum mechanical framework. Some of these include the use of Ritz methods for the determination of the spectra of the helium atom, 1930 Hartree–Fock method, 1964 density functional theory and variational Monte Carlo and 1992 density matrix renormalization group (DMRG).

=== Quantum algorithms ===
In 2014, variational principles were part of a hybrid strategy, called noisy intermediate-scale quantum (NISQ) computing, to combine powerful but imperfect quantum computers coupled with classical computers. The first proposals included a variational quantum eigensolver to exploit quantum phenomena to simulate atoms and small molecules using variational methods and an approximate optimization algorithm.
