= Hamilton's optical-mechanical analogy =

Conceptual parallel between optics and classical mechanics

Hamiltonian Optics—Rays and Wavefronts

Hamilton's optical-mechanical analogy (also written Hamilton's optico-mechanical analogy) is a conceptual parallel between trajectories in classical mechanics and wavefronts in optics, introduced by William Rowan Hamilton around 1831. It may be viewed as linking Huygens' principle of optics with Maupertuis' principle of mechanics.

While Hamilton discovered the analogy in 1831, it was not applied practically until Hans Busch used it to explain electron beam focusing in 1925. According to Cornelius Lanczos, the analogy has been important in the development of ideas in quantum physics. Erwin Schrödinger cites the analogy in the very first sentence of his paper introducing his wave mechanics. Later in the body of his paper he says:

Unfortunately this powerful and momentous conception of Hamilton is deprived, in most modern reproductions, of its beautiful raiment as a superfluous accessory, in favour of a more colourless representation of the analytical correspondence.

Quantitative and formal analysis based on the analogy use the Hamilton–Jacobi equation; conversely the analogy provides an alternative and more accessible path for introducing the Hamilton–Jacobi equation approach to mechanics. The orthogonality of mechanical trajectories characteristic of geometrical optics to the optical wavefronts characteristic of a full wave equation, resulting from the variational principle, leads to the corresponding differential equations.

== Hamilton's analogy ==
The propagation of light can be considered in terms of rays and wavefronts in ordinary physical three-dimensional space. The wavefronts are two-dimensional curved surfaces; the rays are one-dimensional curved lines. Hamilton's analogy amounts to two interpretations of a figure like the one shown here. In the optical interpretation, the green wavefronts are lines of constant phase and the orthogonal red lines are the rays of geometrical optics. In the mechanical interpretation, the green lines denote constant values of action derived by applying Hamilton's principle to mechanical motion and the red lines are the orthogonal object trajectories.

The orthogonality of the wavefronts to rays (or equal-action surfaces to trajectories) means we can compute one set from the other set. This explains how Kirchhoff's diffraction formula predicts a wave phenomenon – diffraction – using only geometrical ray tracing. Rays traced from the source to an aperture give a wavefront that becomes sources for rays reaching the diffraction pattern where they are summed using complex phases from the orthogonal wavefronts.

The wavefronts and rays or the equal-action surfaces and trajectories are dual objects linked by orthogonality. On one hand, a ray can be regarded as the orbit of a particle of light. It successively punctures the wave surfaces. The successive punctures can be regarded as defining the trajectory of the particle. On the other hand, a wave-front can be regarded as a level surface of displacement of some quantity, such as electric field intensity, hydrostatic pressure, particle number density, oscillatory phase, or probability amplitude. Then the physical meaning of the rays is less evident.

== Huygens' principle; Fermat's principle ==
The Hamilton optical-mechanical analogy is closely related to Fermat's principle and thus to the Huygens–Fresnel principle. Fermat's principle states that the rays between wavefronts will take the path least time; the concept of successive wavefronts derives from Huygens principle.

== Extended Huygens' principle ==
Going beyond ordinary three-dimensional physical space, one can imagine a higher dimensional abstract configuration "space", with a dimension a multiple of 3. In this space, one can imagine again rays as one-dimensional curved lines. Now the wavefronts are hypersurfaces of dimension one less than the dimension of the space. Such a multi-dimensional space can serve as a configuration space for a multi-particle system.

== Classical limit of the Schrödinger equation ==
Albert Messiah considers a classical limit of the Schrödinger equation. He finds there an optical analogy. The trajectories of his particles are orthogonal to the surfaces of equal phase. He writes "In the language of optics, the latter are the wave fronts, and the trajectories of the particles are the rays. Hence the classical approximation is equivalent to the geometric optics approximation: we find once again, as a consequence of the Schrödinger equation, the basic postulate of the theory of matter waves."

== History ==
Hamilton's optical-mechanical analogy played a critical part in the thinking of Schrödinger, one of the originators of quantum mechanics. Section 1 of his paper published in December 1926 is titled "The Hamiltonian analogy between mechanics and optics". Section 1 of the first of his four lectures on wave mechanics delivered in 1928 is titled "Derivation of the fundamental idea of wave mechanics from Hamilton's analogy between ordinary mechanics and geometrical optics".

In a brief paper in 1923, de Broglie wrote : "Dynamics must undergo the same evolution that optics has undergone when undulations took the place of purely geometrical optics." In his 1924 thesis, though Louis de Broglie did not name the optical-mechanical analogy, he wrote in his introduction,

... a single principle, that of Maupertuis, and later in another form as Hamilton's Principle of least action ... Fermat's ... principle ..., which nowadays is usually called the principle of least action. ... Huygens propounded an undulatory theory of light, while Newton, calling on an analogy with the material point dynamics that he created, developed a corpuscular theory, the so-called "emission theory", which enabled him even to explain, albeit with a contrived hypothesis, effects nowadays considered wave effects, (i.e., Newton's rings).

In the opinion of Léon Rosenfeld, a close colleague of Niels Bohr, "... Schrödinger [was] inspired by Hamilton's beautiful comparison of classical mechanics and geometrical optics ..."

The first textbook in English on wave mechanics devotes the second of its two chapters to "Wave mechanics in relation to ordinary mechanics". It opines "... de Broglie and Schrödinger have turned this false analogy into a true one by using the natural Unit or Measure of Action, h, .... ... We must now go into Hamilton's theory in more detail, for when once its true meaning is grasped the step to wave mechanics is but a short one—indeed now, after the event, almost seems to suggest itself."

According to one textbook, "The first part of our problem, namely, the establishment of a system of first-order equations satisfying the spacetime symmetry condition, can be solved in a very simple way, with the help of the analogy between mechanics and optics, which was the starting point for the development of wave mechanics and which can still be used—with reservations—as a source of inspiration."

Recently the concept has been extended to wavelength dependent regime.

== Optics, oceanology and QM ==
The analogy between the three fields of optics, oceanology and quantum mechanics can be summarized in the following table. The first row shows the full wave equations from optics, oceanology and QM, namely the Helmholtz equation, the PDE governing the sea surface elevation $\eta$ and the Schrödinger equation respectively.

The second row is the first order WKB approximation, i.e. the slowly varying amplitude variation and the equations obtained are the Eikonal equation of optics and oceanology and the Hamilton-Jacobi equation.

The third row is the second order WKB approximation and the equations obtained are the transport of intensity equation in optics, the wave energy equation in oceanology and the Liouville equation.

Scope	Optics	Oceanology	Quantum mechanics
Full wave equation	$\nabla^2 \psi - \frac{1}{c^2(x)} \frac{\partial^2 \psi}{\partial t^2} = 0$	$\frac{\partial ^2 \eta }{\partial x^2} = g \frac{\partial}{\partial x}\left(h\frac{\partial \eta}{\partial x}\right)$	$i\hbar \,\partial_t \psi = \hat{H}\psi$
First order (phase)	$|\nabla S(x)|^2 = n^2(x)$	$\partial_t S + \omega(x,\nabla S) = 0$	$\partial_t S + H(x,\nabla S,t) = 0$
Second order (transport)	$k\partial_z I+\nabla \cdot (I \nabla \Phi)=0$	$\partial_t \mathcal{A} + \nabla \cdot (\mathcal{A}\, v_g) = 0$	$\partial_t \rho + \nabla \cdot (\rho\, v) = 0$
