= Gauss's principle of least constraint =

Formulation in classical mechanics

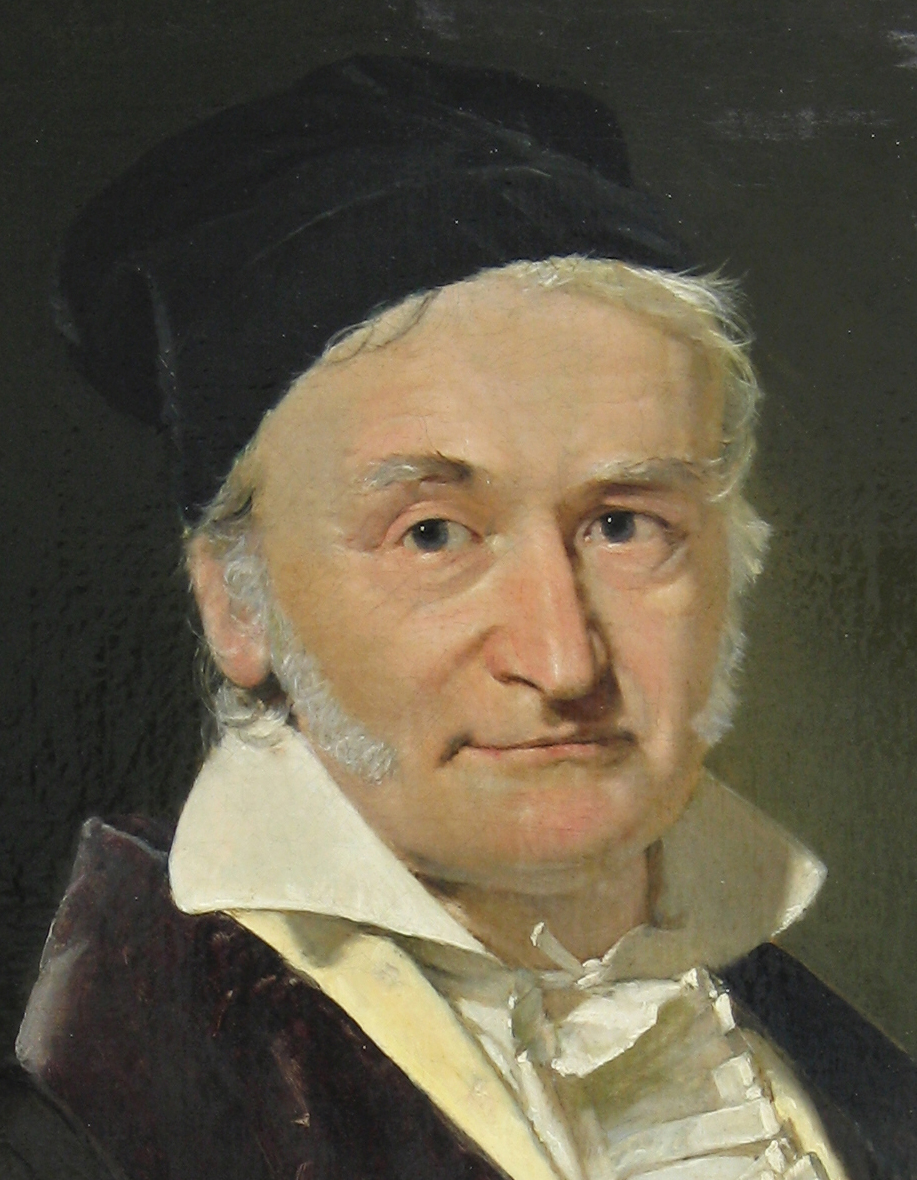
Carl Friederich Gauss

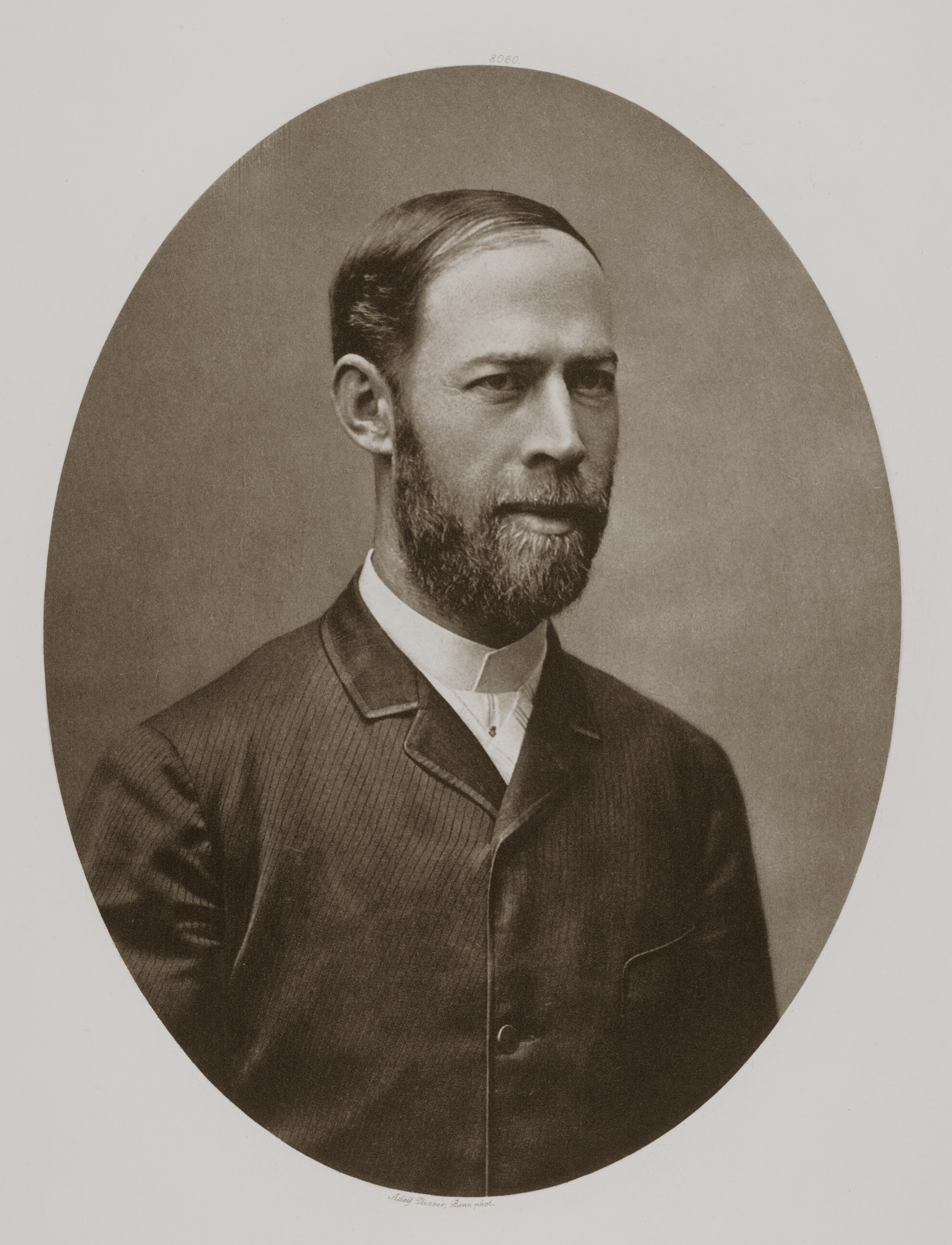
Heinrich Hertz

Gauss and Hertz devised variational principles of mechanics

The principle of least constraint is one variational formulation of classical mechanics enunciated by Carl Friedrich Gauss in 1829, equivalent to all other formulations of analytical mechanics. Intuitively, it says that the acceleration of a constrained physical system will be as similar as possible to that of the corresponding unconstrained system.

== Statement ==
The principle of least constraint is a least squares principle stating that the true accelerations of a mechanical system of $n$ masses is the minimum of the quantity

$$Z \, \stackrel{\mathrm{def}}{=} \sum_{j=1}^{n} m_j \cdot \left| \, \ddot \mathbf{r}_j - \frac{\mathbf{F}_j}{m_j} \right|^{2}$$

where the jth particle has mass $m_j$, position vector $\mathbf{r}_j$, and applied non-constraint force $\mathbf{F}_j$ acting on the mass.

The notation $\dot \mathbf{r}$ indicates time derivative of a vector function $\mathbf{r}(t)$, i.e. position. The corresponding accelerations $\ddot \mathbf{r}_j$ satisfy the imposed constraints, which in general depends on the current state of the system, $\{ \mathbf{r}_j(t), \dot \mathbf{r}_j(t) \}$.

It is recalled the fact that due to active $\mathbf{F}_j$ and reactive (constraint) $\mathbf{F_c}_j$ forces being applied, with resultant $\mathbf{R} = \sum_{j=1}^{n} \mathbf{F}_j + \mathbf{F_c}_j$, a system will experience an acceleration $\ddot \mathbf{r} = \sum_{j=1}^{n} \frac{ \mathbf{F}_j }{ m_j } + \frac{ \mathbf{F_c}_j }{m_j} = \sum_{j=1}^{n} \mathbf{a}_j + \mathbf{a_c}_j$.

=== Connections to other formulations ===
Gauss's principle is equivalent to D'Alembert's principle.

The principle of least constraint is qualitatively similar to Hamilton's principle, which states that the true path taken by a mechanical system is an extremum of the action. However, Gauss's principle is a true (local) minimal principle, whereas the other is an extremal principle.

== Hertz's principle of least curvature ==
Hertz's principle of least curvature is a special case of Gauss's principle, restricted by the three conditions that there are no externally applied forces, no interactions (which can usually be expressed as a potential energy), and all masses are equal. Without loss of generality, the masses may be set equal to one. Under these conditions, Gauss's minimized quantity can be written

$$Z = \sum_{j=1}^{n} \left| \ddot \mathbf{r}_j \right|^{2}$$

The kinetic energy $T$ is also conserved under these conditions

$$T \ \stackrel{\mathrm{def}}{=}\  \frac{1}{2} \sum_{j=1}^{n} \left| \dot \mathbf{r}_j \right|^{2}$$

Since the line element $ds^{2}$ in the $3N$-dimensional space of the coordinates is defined

$$ds^{2} \ \stackrel{\mathrm{def}}{=}\  \sum_{j=1}^{n} \left| d\mathbf{r}_j \right|^{2}$$

the conservation of energy may also be written

$$\left( \frac{ds}{dt} \right)^{2} = 2T$$

Dividing $Z$ by $2T$ yields another minimal quantity

$$K \ \stackrel{\mathrm{def}}{=}\  \sum_{j=1}^{n} \left| \frac{d^{2} \mathbf{r}_j}{ds^{2}}\right|^{2}$$

Since $\sqrt{K}$ is the local curvature of the trajectory in the $3n$-dimensional space of the coordinates, minimization of $K$ is equivalent to finding the trajectory of least curvature (a geodesic) that is consistent with the constraints.

Hertz's principle is also a special case of Jacobi's formulation of the least-action principle.

=== Philosophy ===
Hertz designed the principle to eliminate the concept of force and dynamics, so that physics would consist exclusively of kinematics, of material points in constrained motion. He was critical of the "logical obscurity" surrounding the idea of force.

I would mention the experience that it is exceedingly difficult to expound to thoughtful hearers that very introduction to mechanics without being occasionally embarrassed, without feeling tempted now and again to apologize, without wishing to get as quickly as possible over the rudiments, and on to examples which speak for themselves. I fancy that Newton himself must have felt this embarrassment...

To replace the concept of force, he proposed that the acceleration of visible masses are to be accounted for, not by force, but by geometric constraints on the visible masses, and their geometric linkages to invisible masses. In this, he understood himself as continuing the tradition of Cartesian mechanical philosophy, such as Boltzmann's explaining of heat by atomic motion, and Maxwell's explaining of electromagnetism by ether motion. Even though both atoms and the ether were not observable except via their effects, they were successful in explaining apparently non-mechanical phenomena mechanically. In trying to explain away "mechanical force", Hertz was "mechanizing classical mechanics".

== See also ==
- Appell's equation of motion

== Literature ==
- Gauss, C. F. (1829). "Über ein neues allgemeines Grundgesetz der Mechanik". Crelle's Journal. 1829 (4): 232–235. doi:10.1515/crll.1829.4.232. S2CID 199545985.
- Gauss, Carl Friedrich. Werke [Collected Works]. Vol. 5. pp. 23–28.
- Hertz, Heinrich (1896). Principles of Mechanics. Miscellaneous Papers. Vol. III. Macmillan.
- Lanczos, Cornelius (1986). "IV §8 Gauss's principle of least constraint". The variational principles of mechanics (Reprint of University of Toronto 1970 4th ed.). Courier Dover. pp. 106–110. ISBN 978-0-486-65067-8.
- Papastavridis, John G. (2014). "6.6 The Principle of Gauss (extensive treatment)". Analytical mechanics: A comprehensive treatise on the dynamics of constrained systems (Reprint ed.). Singapore, Hackensack NJ, London: World Scientific Publishing Co. Pte. Ltd. pp. 911–930. ISBN 978-981-4338-71-4.
