= Variational asymptotic method =

Variational Asymptotic Method (VAM) is a powerful mathematical approach to simplify the process of finding stationary points for a described functional by taking advantage of small parameters. VAM is the synergy of variational principles and asymptotic approaches. Variational principles are applied to the defined functional as well as the asymptotes are applied to the same functional instead of applying on differential equations which is more prone error. This methodology is applicable for a whole range of physics problems, where the problem has to be defined in a variational form and should be able to identify the small parameters within the problem definition. In other words, VAM can be applicable where the functional is so complex in determining the stationary points either by analytical or by computationally expensive numerical analysis with an advantage of small parameters. Thus, approximate stationary points in the functional can be utilized to obtain the original functional.

== Introduction ==
VAM was first initiated by Berdichevsky in 1979 for shell analysis. He applied VAM to develop nonlinear shell theory in 1980 and for the beams in 1982. This method can construct accurate models for dimensionally reducible structures and in analyzing geometric and material nonlinear models. Berdichevsky elucidated VAM procedure thoroughly and applied for shell structures to obtain the in-plane and out-of-plane warping functions, where an introduced warping function is a kind of bridge between 1-D and 3-D fields, and derived the analytical expressions to attain three dimensional displacements, stresses and strains. In the beginning, the asymptotic methods are used to develop cross-sectional analysis of anisotropic beams with finite-element based solutions. The development of the formulation in the Variational Asymptotic Beam Sectional Analysis (VABS) was started in 1988, and various former students of Hodges made contributions to this project, including Hodges, Cesnik and Hodges, and Yu et al. A more detailed account of the VABS history can be found in Hodges’s book. Thereafter, linear cross-sectional problems are solved for materials with anisotropic and inhomogeneous properties. VABS, a novel finite-element-based code, for the beam cross-sectional analysis and extended this work to piezoelectric materials which ultimately led for the development of VABS and UM/VABS. Hodges and his co-workers introduced many generalizations to cross sectional analysis. Subsequently, using VAM, an effective plate model unifying homogenization procedure and a dimensional reduction process were established, to deal with realistic heterogeneous plates VAPAS has been implemented which is based on finite element technique. This work has been extended for the analysis of laminated composite plates. VAM is also used to develop the Variational Asymptotic Method For Unit Cell Homogenization (VAMUCH) for heterogeneous materials.

== Procedure ==
In specific structural applications, in beams, the procedure begin with 3-Dimensional analysis and mathematically divide the analysis into 2-Dimensional cross section analysis and 1-Dimensional beam analysis. In the cross section analysis, 1-Dimensional constitutive law can be obtained and is provided as an input to the beam 1-Dimensional analysis. Closed form of analytical expression for warping functions along with set of recovery relations can be achieved to express the 3-D displacements, strains and stresses. In plates/shells, the 3-Dimensional problem splits into 1-Dimensional through the thickness and 2-Dimensional plate/shell analysis. Therefore, obtained 2-D constitutive law form the thickness analysis can be provided as input to 2-Dimensional analysis. Subsequently, recovery relations can be formed which presents the 3-D displacements, strains and stresses.

== Advantages ==
• No adhoc kinematic assumptions are required

• VAM is fully physics based and developed by neglecting the smaller energy contributions

• This method is capable to capture non-classical nonlinear effects automatically

• Asymptotes have been applied to functional instead of applying to differential equations, which led to less errors

• Mathematically rigorous theory, yet engineer-friendly end results

• VAM is an efficient method and obtained results are accurate

• Implementation of VAM can allow to use analytical and/or numerical approaches

• Right tool for the validation of asymptotical correctness with comparison of other theories

== Applications ==
VAM is extensively applied to the structural problems such as beams, plates, shells to find the stresses and strains as stationary points for a strain energy functional based on small parameters. In those structural problems, width and height are the small parameters for beams and thickness is the small parameter for plates and shells. In fact, small parameters (geometric and/or physical) are not limited to the above-mentioned parameters and those can be chosen based on the specific application of the defined problem. In macro mechanics, VAM applied to dimensional reduction of beams, plates, shells and multifunctional structures, where considerable number of small parameters exists. In micro mechanics, VAM is capable in design and analysis of composites, where the fiber and matrix are involved. This methodology is applied not only to linear elastic materials with isotropic in nature but also to different kind of hyper elastic materials with orthotropic in nature, where the hyper elastic materials plays important role in the application of bio-implants, study of soft tissues behavior, high altitude airships etc. and the materials have geometric and material nonlinearities. In addition, this method is applicable for different type of materials such as dielectric materials, multi-functional composite materials, energy harvesting materials etc. This approach can be used in aerospace structural analysis, fabrics design and analysis, automotive industries etc. It can handle various type of analysis such as static, dynamic, multi-physics, buckling, modal problems. Subsequently, various computer codes have been developed with the basis of Variational Asymptotic Method such as Variational Asymptotic Beam Analysis (VABS), Variational Asymptotic Plate and Shell Analysis (VAPAS), Dynamic Variational Asymptotic Plate and Shell Analysis (DVAPAS) etc. These computer-based programs are well established and validated for the commercial applications and extensively used to analyze the behavior of composite structures. These various VAM-based developments culminated in the formalization of the mechanics of the structure genome (MSG) as a general framework for multiscale constitutive modeling of composite structures and materials, embodied in the code SwiftComp.
