= Variational principle =

Scientific principles enabling the use of the calculus of variations

A variational principle is a mathematical procedure that renders a physical problem solvable by the calculus of variations, which concerns finding functions that optimize the values of quantities that depend on those functions. For example, the problem of determining the shape of a hanging chain suspended at both ends—a catenary—can be solved using variational calculus, and in this case, the variational principle is the following: The solution is a function that minimizes the gravitational potential energy of the chain.

== History ==
=== Physics ===
The concept of a variational principle emerged from earlier work like Fermat's principle for optics in 1662. The first application of the variational technique, albeit as a special-case rather than a general principle, was James Bernoulli's solution of the brachistochrone problem in 1718. Pierre Louis Maupertuis generalized Fermat's concept to mechanics, in the form of a principle of least action. These principles were linked to a more general principle of least action by William Rowan Hamilton in 1831, showing that the motion of matter particles and the motion of light waves could be described in the same way. Hamilton's work was an important influence on the early 20th century research into wave-particle duality, culminating in the 1926 discovery of Schrodinger's equation.

=== Math ===
Felix Klein's 1872 Erlangen program attempted to identify invariants under a group of transformations.

== Examples ==
=== In mathematics ===
- Ekeland's variational principle in mathematical optimization
- The finite element method
- The variation principle relating topological entropy and Kolmogorov-Sinai entropy.

=== In physics ===
Variational principles for classical mechanics was developed in parallel with Newtonian mechanics.

- The Rayleigh–Ritz method for solving boundary-value problems in elasticity and wave propagation
- Fermat's principle in geometrical optics
- Hamilton's principle in classical mechanics
- Maupertuis' principle in classical mechanics
- The principle of least action in mechanics, electromagnetic theory, and quantum mechanics
- The variational method in quantum mechanics
- Hellmann–Feynman theorem
- Gauss's principle of least constraint and Hertz's principle of least curvature
- Hilbert's action principle in general relativity, leading to the Einstein field equations.
- Palatini variation
- Hartree–Fock method
- Density functional theory
- Gibbons–Hawking–York boundary term
- Variational quantum eigensolver
