= Maupertuis's principle =

Principle of least length in physics

In classical mechanics, Maupertuis's principle (named after Pierre Louis Maupertuis, 1698 – 1759) states that the path followed by a physical system is the one of least length (with a suitable interpretation of path and length). It is a special case of the more generally stated principle of least action. Using the calculus of variations, it results in an integral equation formulation of the equations of motion for the system.

== Mathematical formulation ==
Maupertuis's principle states that the true path of a system described by $N$ generalized coordinates $\mathbf{q} = \left( q_{1}, q_{2}, \ldots, q_{N} \right)$ between two specified states $\mathbf{q}_{1}$ and $\mathbf{q}_{2}$ is a minimum or a saddle point of the abbreviated action functional,

$$\mathcal{S}_{0}[\mathbf{q}(t)] \ \stackrel{\mathrm{def}}{=}\
\int \mathbf{p} \cdot d\mathbf{q},$$
where $\mathbf{p} = \left( p_{1}, p_{2}, \ldots, p_{N} \right)$ are the conjugate momenta of the generalized coordinates, defined by the equation
$$p_{k} \ \stackrel{\mathrm{def}}{=}\  \frac{\partial L}{\partial\dot{q}_{k}},$$
where $L(\mathbf{q},\dot{\mathbf{q}},t)$ is the Lagrangian function for the system. In other words, any first-order perturbation of the path results in (at most) second-order changes in $\mathcal{S}_{0}$. Note that the abbreviated action $\mathcal{S}_{0}$ is a functional (i.e. a function from a vector space into its underlying scalar field), which in this case takes as its input a function (i.e. the paths between the two specified states).

== Jacobi's formulation ==
For many systems, the kinetic energy $T$ is quadratic in the generalized velocities $\dot{\mathbf{q}}$
$$T = \frac{1}{2} \dot{\mathbf{q}} \ \mathbf{M} \ \dot{\mathbf{q}}^\intercal$$
although the mass tensor $\mathbf{M}$ may be a complicated function of the generalized coordinates $\mathbf{q}$. For such systems, a simple relation relates the kinetic energy, the generalized momenta and the generalized velocities
$$2 T = \mathbf{p} \cdot \dot{\mathbf{q}}$$
provided that the potential energy $V(\mathbf{q})$ does not involve the generalized velocities. By defining a normalized distance or metric $ds$ in the space of generalized coordinates
$$ds^2 = d\mathbf{q} \ \mathbf{M} \ d\mathbf{q^\intercal}$$
one may immediately recognize the mass tensor as a metric tensor. The kinetic energy may be written in a massless form
$$T = \frac{1}{2} \left( \frac{ds}{dt} \right)^{2}$$
or,
$$2 T dt = \sqrt{2 T} \ ds.$$

Therefore, the abbreviated action can be written
$$\mathcal{S}_0 \ \stackrel{\mathrm{def}}{=}\  \int \mathbf{p} \cdot d\mathbf{q} =
\int ds \, \sqrt{2}\sqrt{E_\text{tot} - V(\mathbf{q})}$$
since the kinetic energy $T = E_\text{tot} - V(\mathbf{q})$ equals the (constant) total energy $E_\text{tot}$ minus the potential energy $V(\mathbf{q})$. In particular, if the potential energy is a constant, then Jacobi's principle reduces to minimizing the path length $s = \int ds$ in the space of the generalized coordinates, which is equivalent to Hertz's principle of least curvature.

== Comparison with Hamilton's principle ==
Hamilton's principle and Maupertuis's principle are occasionally confused with each other and both have been called the principle of least action. They differ from each other in three important ways:

- their definition of the action...
  Hamilton's principle uses $\mathcal{S} \ \stackrel{\mathrm{def}}{=}\ \int L \, dt$, the integral of the Lagrangian over time, varied between two fixed end times $t_1$, $t_2$ and endpoints $q_1$, $q_2$. By contrast, Maupertuis's principle uses the abbreviated action integral over the generalized coordinates, varied along all constant energy paths ending at $\mathbf{q}_1$ and $\mathbf{q}_2$.
- the solution that they determine...
  Hamilton's principle determines the trajectory $\mathbf{q}(t)$ as a function of time, whereas Maupertuis's principle determines only the shape of the trajectory in the generalized coordinates. For example, Maupertuis's principle determines the shape of the ellipse on which a particle moves under the influence of an inverse-square central force such as gravity, but does not describe per se how the particle moves along that trajectory. (However, this time parameterization may be determined from the trajectory itself in subsequent calculations using the conservation of energy.) By contrast, Hamilton's principle directly specifies the motion along the ellipse as a function of time.
- ...and the constraints on the variation.
  Maupertuis's principle requires that the two endpoint states $q_1$ and $q_2$ be given and that energy be conserved along every trajectory. By contrast, Hamilton's principle does not require the conservation of energy, but does require that the endpoint times $t_1$ and $t_2$ be specified as well as the endpoint states $q_1$ and $q_2$.

== History ==
Maupertuis was the first to publish a principle of least action, as a way of adapting Fermat's principle for waves to a corpuscular (particle) theory of light. Pierre de Fermat had explained Snell's law for the refraction of light by assuming light follows the path of shortest time, not distance. This troubled Maupertuis, since he felt that time and distance should be on an equal footing: "why should light prefer the path of shortest time over that of distance?" Maupertuis defined his action as $\int v \, ds$, which was to be minimized over all paths connecting two specified points. Here $v$ is the velocity of light the corpuscular theory. Fermat had minimized $\int \,ds/v$ where $v$ is wave velocity; the two velocities are reciprocal so the two forms are equivalent.

=== Koenig's claim ===
In 1751, Maupertuis's priority for the principle of least action was challenged in print (Nova Acta Eruditorum of Leipzig) by an old acquaintance, Johann Samuel Koenig, who quoted a 1707 letter purportedly from Gottfried Wilhelm Leibniz to Jakob Hermann that described results similar to those derived by Leonhard Euler in 1744.

Maupertuis demanded that Koenig produce the original letter to authenticate it, as Leibniz had died in 1716 and Hermann in 1733. Koenig claimed to have a copy of the original letter, which had been lost after its owner Samuel Henzi had been executed in 1749 for sedition against the aristocratic government of Bern. Subsequently, the Berlin Academy under Euler's direction declared the letter fraudulent and supported Maupertuis. Curiously Voltaire got involved in the quarrel by composing Diatribe du docteur Akakia ("Diatribe of Doctor Akakia") to satirize Maupertuis' scientific theories (not limited to the principle of least action). While this work damaged Maupertuis's reputation, his claim to priority for least action remains secure.

== See also ==
- Analytical mechanics
- Hamilton's principle
- Gauss's principle of least constraint (also describes Hertz's principle of least curvature)
- Hamilton–Jacobi equation
