= Constraint (mechanics) =

Parameter which a physical system must obey

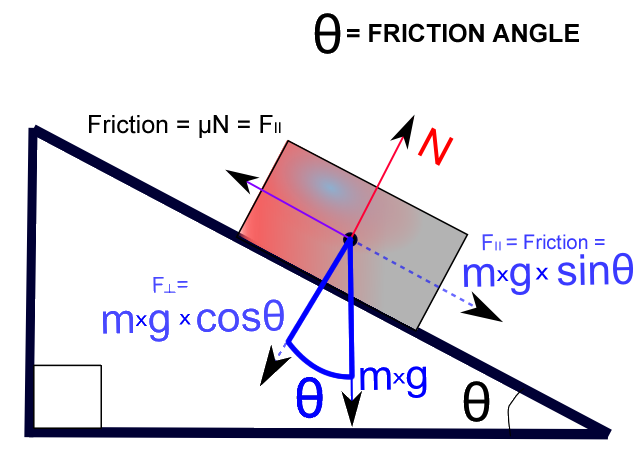
In this system the box slides down a slope, the constraint is that the box must remain on the slope (it cannot go through it or start flying).

In classical mechanics, a constraint on a system is a parameter that the system must obey. For example, a box sliding down a slope must remain on the slope. There are two different types of constraints: holonomic and non-holonomic.

== Types of constraint ==
- First class constraints and second class constraints
- Primary constraints, secondary constraints, tertiary constraints, quaternary constraints
- Holonomic constraints, also called integrable constraints, (depending on time and the coordinates but not on the momenta) and Nonholonomic system
- Pfaffian constraints
- Scleronomic constraints (not depending on time) and rheonomic constraints (depending on time)
- Ideal constraints: those for which the work done by the constraint forces under a virtual displacement vanishes.
