= Quantization (physics) =

Systematic procedure of turning a classical theory into a quantum one

Quantization (in British English quantisation) is the systematic transition procedure from a classical understanding of physical phenomena to a newer understanding known as quantum mechanics. It is a procedure for constructing quantum mechanics from classical mechanics. A generalization involving infinite degrees of freedom is field quantization, as in the "quantization of the electromagnetic field", referring to photons as field "quanta" (for instance as light quanta). This procedure is basic to theories of atomic physics, chemistry, particle physics, nuclear physics, condensed matter physics, and quantum optics.

== Historical overview ==
In 1901, when Max Planck was developing the distribution function of statistical mechanics to solve the ultraviolet catastrophe problem, he realized that the properties of blackbody radiation can be explained by the assumption that the amount of energy must be in countable fundamental units, i.e. amount of energy is not continuous but discrete. That is, a minimum unit of energy exists and the following relationship holds $E = h \nu$ for the frequency $\nu$. Here, $h$ is called the Planck constant, which represents the amount of the quantum mechanical effect. It means a fundamental change of mathematical model of physical quantities.

In 1905, Albert Einstein published a paper, "On a heuristic viewpoint concerning the emission and transformation of light", which explained the photoelectric effect on quantized electromagnetic waves. The energy quantum referred to in this paper was later called "photon". In July 1913, Niels Bohr used quantization to describe the spectrum of a hydrogen atom in his paper "On the constitution of atoms and molecules".

The preceding theories have been successful, but they are very phenomenological theories. However, the French mathematician Henri Poincaré first gave a systematic and rigorous definition of what quantization is in his 1912 paper "Sur la théorie des quanta".

The term "quantum physics" was first used in Johnston's Planck's Universe in Light of Modern Physics. (1931).

== Canonical quantization ==
Canonical quantization develops quantum mechanics from classical mechanics. One introduces a commutation relation among canonical coordinates. Technically, one converts coordinates to operators, through combinations of creation and annihilation operators. The operators act on quantum states of the theory. The lowest energy state is called the vacuum state.

== Quantization schemes ==
Even within the setting of canonical quantization, there is difficulty associated to quantizing arbitrary observables on the classical phase space. This is the ordering ambiguity: classically, the position and momentum variables x and p commute, but their quantum mechanical operator counterparts do not. Various quantization schemes have been proposed to resolve this ambiguity, of which the most popular is the Weyl quantization scheme. Nevertheless, Groenewold's theorem dictates that no perfect quantization scheme exists. Specifically, if the quantizations of x and p are taken to be the usual position and momentum operators, then no quantization scheme can perfectly reproduce the Poisson bracket relations among the classical observables.

== Covariant canonical quantization ==
There is a way to perform a canonical quantization without having to resort to the non covariant approach of foliating spacetime and choosing a Hamiltonian. This method is based upon a classical action, but is different from the functional integral approach.

The method does not apply to all possible actions (for instance, actions with a noncausal structure or actions with gauge "flows"). It starts with the classical algebra of all (smooth) functionals over the configuration space. This algebra is quotiented over by the ideal generated by the Euler–Lagrange equations. Then, this quotient algebra is converted into a Poisson algebra by introducing a Poisson bracket derivable from the action, called the Peierls bracket. This Poisson algebra is then ℏ -deformed in the same way as in canonical quantization.

In quantum field theory, there is also a way to quantize actions with gauge "flows". It involves the Batalin–Vilkovisky formalism, an extension of the BRST formalism.

== Deformation quantization ==
One of the earliest attempts at a natural quantization was Weyl quantization, proposed by Hermann Weyl in 1927. Here, an attempt is made to associate a quantum-mechanical observable (a self-adjoint operator on a Hilbert space) with a real-valued function on classical phase space. The position and momentum in this phase space are mapped to the generators of the Heisenberg group, and the Hilbert space appears as a group representation of the Heisenberg group. In 1946, H. J. Groenewold considered the product of a pair of such observables and asked what the corresponding function would be on the classical phase space. This led him to discover the phase-space star-product of a pair of functions. More generally, this technique leads to deformation quantization, where the ★-product is taken to be a deformation of the algebra of functions on a symplectic manifold or Poisson manifold. However, as a natural quantization scheme (a functor), Weyl's map is not satisfactory.

For example, the Weyl map of the classical angular-momentum-squared is not just the quantum angular momentum squared operator, but it further contains a constant term 3ħ^{2}/2. (This extra term offset is pedagogically significant, since it accounts for the nonvanishing angular momentum of the ground-state Bohr orbit in the hydrogen atom, even though the standard QM ground state of the atom has vanishing l.)

As a mere representation change, however, Weyl's map is useful and important, as it underlies the alternate equivalent phase space formulation of conventional quantum mechanics.

== Geometric quantization ==
In mathematical physics, geometric quantization is a mathematical approach to defining a quantum theory corresponding to a given classical theory. It attempts to carry out quantization, for which there is in general no exact recipe, in such a way that certain analogies between the classical theory and the quantum theory remain manifest. For example, the similarity between the Heisenberg equation in the Heisenberg picture of quantum mechanics and the Hamilton equation in classical physics should be built in.

A more geometric approach to quantization, in which the classical phase space can be a general symplectic manifold, was developed in the 1970s by Bertram Kostant and Jean-Marie Souriau. The method proceeds in two stages. First, once constructs a "prequantum Hilbert space" consisting of square-integrable functions (or, more properly, sections of a line bundle) over the phase space. Here one can construct operators satisfying commutation relations corresponding exactly to the classical Poisson-bracket relations. On the other hand, this prequantum Hilbert space is too big to be physically meaningful. One then restricts to functions (or sections) depending on half the variables on the phase space, yielding the quantum Hilbert space.

== Path integral quantization ==
A classical mechanical theory is given by an action with the permissible configurations being the ones which are extremal with respect to functional variations of the action. A quantum-mechanical description of the classical system can also be constructed from the action of the system by means of the path integral formulation.

== Other types ==
- Loop quantum gravity (loop quantization)
- Uncertainty principle (quantum statistical mechanics approach)
- Schwinger's quantum action principle

== See also ==
- First quantization
- Feynman path integral
- Light front quantization
- Photon polarization
- Quantum decoherence
- Quantum Hall effect
- Quantum number
- Stochastic quantization
