= I – Shih Liu =

British mathematician (born 1995)

I-Shih Liu
- Born: 1943 (age 82–83); Taiwan
- Education: Johns Hopkins University; National Taiwan University
- Known for: Müller—Liu entropy principle; Liu Lagrange multiplier method
- Children: 1
- Scientific career
- Fields: applied mechanics; Continuum mechanics; Thermodynamics; Elasticity (physics); Constitutive equation; Boundary value problem; entropy
- Workplaces: Federal University of Rio de Janeiro
- Thesis: On Irreversible Thermodynamics (1972)
- Doctoral advisor: Ingo Müller

I – Shih Liu (Chinese:劉宜實) (1943) is a Taiwanese civil engineer. He teaches at the Institute of Mathematics of Federal University of Rio de Janeiro.

== Education ==
I – Shih Liu studied at the National Taiwan University and graduated with a diploma in 1972. He continued his studies at the Johns Hopkins University (JHU) where he received his doctorate in applied mechanics in 1972 under the supervision of Ingo Müller.

== Academic life ==
He became assistant professor at the National Taiwan University in 1965, teaching and research assistant at the Johns Hopkins University in 1967, post-doctoral fellow in 1972 and professor at Federal University of Rio de Janeiro (UFRJ) in 1972. He became visiting professor at Carnegie Mellon University in 1976–1977, at University of Bologna in 1982, 1986, at University of Berlin in 1990-1991 and Nagoya Institute of Technology in 2004. He also became visiting professor at Texas A&M University in 2006–2007, at College of Earth Sciences National Central University in 2012 and director pro-tempore at UFRJ in 2000–2002. Since 1972, he has more than 50 mathematical research articles published in peer-reviewed international journals. He is married with one son.

== Research areas ==
His work deals with continuum mechanics, thermodynamics, relativistic mechanics, rigid body mechanics, elastodynamics, mechanics of deformable bodies, constitutive theories, entropy principle, Lagrange multipliers.

== Writings ==
- Introduction to Continuum Mechanics, Springer-Verlag, 2002
- with Jose Merodio e Giuseppe Saccomandi: Constitutive Theories: Basic Principles Chapter 6 in Continuum Mechanics, in Encyclopedia of Life Support Systems (EOLSS) Developed under the auspices of the UNESCO Publications, 2009
- A Continuum Mechanics Primer Lecture Note - On Constitutive Theories of Materials, 2010
- Introduction to Continuum Mechanics Lecture Note, 2018
- Elementary Tensor Analysis Lecture Note, 2018

== Selected publications ==
- Liu, I.-S. (1972): Method of Lagrange Multipliers for Exploitation of the Entropy Principle | Arch. Rat. Mech. Anal. (ARMA); vol. 46, no. 2, pp. 131–148. Doi:10.1007/BF00250688
- Liu, I.-S. (1973): (a) A Non-Simple Heat-Conducting Fluid | Arch. Rat. Mech. Anal. (ARMA); vol. 50, no. 1, pp. 26–33. Doi:10.1007/BF00251292
- Liu, I.-S. (1973): (b) On the Entropy Supply in a Classical and a Relativistic Fluid | Arch. Rat. Mech. Anal. (ARMA); vol. 50, no. 2, pp. 111–117. Doi:10.1007/BF00249878
- Liu, I.-S. (1982): On Representations of Anisotropic Invariants | Int. J. Eng. Sci. (IJES); vol. 20, no. 10, pp. 1099–1109. Doi:10.1016/0020-7225(82)90092-1
- Liu, I.-S. (1996): On Entropy Flux-Heat Flux Relation in Thermodynamics with Lagrange Multipliers | Cont. Mech. Thermodyn. (CMT); vol. 8, pp. 247–256. Doi:10.1007/s001610050042
- Liu, I.-S. (2001): Constitutive Equations of Extended Thermodynamics from a Hybrid Pair of Generator Functions | Cont. Mech. Thermodyn. (CMT); vol. 13, no. 1, pp. 25–39. Doi:10.1007/s001610100040
- Liu, I.-S. (2003): On the Transformation Property of the Deformation Gradient under a Change of Frame | J. Elast. (JELAS); vol. 71, no. 1, pp. 73–80. Doi:10.1023/B:ELAS.0000005548.36767.e7
- Liu, I.-S. (2005): Further Remarks on Euclidean Objectivity and the Principle of Material Frame-Indifference | Cont. Mech. Thermodyn. (CMT); vol. 17, no. 2, pp. 125–133. Doi:10.1007/s00161-004-0191-3
- Liu, I.-S. (2008): Entropy Flux Relation for Viscoelastic Bodies | J. Elast. (JELAS); vol. 90, no. 3, pp. 259–270. doi:10.1007/s10659-007-9142-0
- Liu, I.-S. (2009): (a) Constitutive Theory of Anisotropic Rigid Heat Conductors | J. Math. Phys. (JMP); vol. 50, no. 8, pp. 083506. Doi:10.1063/1.3190487
- Liu, I.-S. (2009): (b) On Entropy Flux of Transversely-Isotropic Elastic Bodies | J. Elast. (JELAS); vol. 96, no. 2, pp. 97–104. Doi:10.1007/s10659-009-9200-x
- Liu, I.-S. (2011): Successive Linear Approximation for Boundary Value Problems of Nonlinear Elasticity in Relative-Descriptional Formulation | Int. J. Eng. Sci. (IJES); vol. 49, no. 7, pp. 635–645. Doi:10.1016/j.ijengsci.2011.02.006
- Liu, I.-S. (2012): A Note on the Mooney–Rivlin Material Model | Continuum Mech. Thermodyn.; vol. 24, no. 4, pp. 583–590. Doi:10.1007/s00161-011-0197-6
- Liu, I.-S. (2014): A Solid-Fluid Mixture Theory of Porous Media | Int. J. Eng. Sci. (IJES); vol. 84, pp. 133–146.Doi:10.1016/j.ijengsci.2014.07.002
