= Free motion equation =

A free motion equation is a differential equation that describes a mechanical system in the absence of external forces, but in the presence only of an inertial force depending on the choice of a reference frame. In non-autonomous mechanics on a configuration space $Q\to \mathbb R$, a free motion equation is defined as a second order non-autonomous dynamic equation on $Q\to \mathbb R$ which is brought into the form

$$\overline q^i_{tt}=0$$

with respect to some reference frame $(t,\overline q^i)$ on $Q\to \mathbb R$. Given an arbitrary reference frame $(t,q^i)$ on $Q\to \mathbb R$, a free motion equation reads

$$q^i_{tt}=d_t\Gamma^i +\partial_j\Gamma^i(q^j_t-\Gamma^j) -
\frac{\partial q^i}{\partial\overline q^m}\frac{\partial\overline q^m}{\partial q^j\partial
q^k}(q^j_t-\Gamma^j) (q^k_t-\Gamma^k),$$

where $\Gamma^i=\partial_t q^i(t,\overline q^j)$ is a connection on $Q\to \mathbb R$ associates with the initial reference frame $(t,\overline q^i)$. The right-hand side of this equation is treated as an inertial force.

A free motion equation need not exist in general. It can be defined if and only if a configuration bundle $Q\to\mathbb R$ of a mechanical system is a toroidal cylinder $T^m\times \mathbb R^k$.

== See also ==
- Non-autonomous mechanics
- Non-autonomous system (mathematics)
- Analytical mechanics
- Fictitious force
