= Relativistic system (mathematics) =

In mathematics, a non-autonomous system of ordinary differential equations is defined to be a dynamic equation on a smooth fiber bundle $Q\to \mathbb R$ over $\mathbb R$. For instance, this is the case of non-relativistic non-autonomous mechanics, but not relativistic mechanics. To describe relativistic mechanics, one should consider a system of ordinary differential equations on a smooth manifold $Q$ whose fibration over $\mathbb R$ is not fixed. Such a system admits transformations of a coordinate $t$ on $\mathbb R$ depending on other coordinates on $Q$. Therefore, it is called the relativistic system. In particular, Special Relativity on the

Minkowski space $Q= \mathbb R^4$ is of this type.

Since a configuration space $Q$ of a relativistic system has no preferable fibration over $\mathbb R$, a velocity space of relativistic system is a first order jet manifold $J^1_1Q$ of one-dimensional submanifolds of $Q$. The notion of jets of submanifolds generalizes that of jets of sections of fiber bundles which are utilized in covariant classical field theory and non-autonomous mechanics. A first order jet bundle $J^1_1Q\to Q$ is projective and, following the terminology of Special Relativity, one can think of its fibers as being spaces of the absolute velocities of a relativistic system. Given coordinates $(q^0, q^i)$ on $Q$, a first order jet manifold $J^1_1Q$ is provided with the adapted coordinates $(q^0,q^i,q^i_0)$ possessing transition functions

$$q'^0=q'^0(q^0,q^k), \quad q'^i=q'^i(q^0,q^k), \quad
{q'}^i_0 = \left(\frac{\partial q'^i}{\partial q^j} q^j_0 + \frac{\partial q'^i}{\partial
q^0} \right) \left(\frac{\partial q'^0}{\partial q^j} q^j_0 + \frac{\partial q'^0}{\partial q^0}
\right)^{-1}.$$

The relativistic velocities of a relativistic system are represented by elements of a fibre bundle $\mathbb R\times TQ$, coordinated by $(\tau,q^\lambda,a^\lambda_\tau)$, where $TQ$ is the tangent bundle of $Q$. Then a generic equation of motion of a relativistic system in terms of relativistic velocities reads

$$\left(\frac{\partial_\lambda G_{\mu\alpha_2\ldots\alpha_{2N}}}{2N}- \partial_\mu
G_{\lambda\alpha_2\ldots\alpha_{2N}}\right) q^\mu_\tau q^{\alpha_2}_\tau\cdots
q^{\alpha_{2N}}_\tau -  (2N-1)G_{\lambda\mu\alpha_3\ldots\alpha_{2N}}q^\mu_{\tau\tau} q^{\alpha_3}_\tau\cdots
q^{\alpha_{2N}}_\tau  + F_{\lambda\mu}q^\mu_\tau =0,$$

$$G_{\alpha_1\ldots\alpha_{2N}}q^{\alpha_1}_\tau\cdots q^{\alpha_{2N}}_\tau=1.$$

For instance, if $Q$ is the Minkowski space with a Minkowski metric $G_{\mu\nu}$, this is an equation of a relativistic charge in the presence of an electromagnetic field.

== See also ==
- Non-autonomous system (mathematics)
- Non-autonomous mechanics
- Relativistic mechanics
- Special relativity
