= Non-autonomous system (mathematics) =

In mathematics, an autonomous system is a dynamic equation on a smooth manifold. A non-autonomous system is a dynamic equation on a smooth fiber bundle $Q\to \mathbb R$ over $\mathbb R$. For instance, this is the case of non-autonomous mechanics.

An r-order differential equation on a fiber bundle $Q\to \mathbb R$ is represented by a closed subbundle of a jet bundle $J^rQ$ of $Q\to \mathbb R$. A dynamic equation on $Q\to \mathbb R$ is a differential equation which is algebraically solved for a higher-order derivatives.

In particular, a first-order dynamic equation on a fiber bundle $Q\to \mathbb R$ is a kernel of the covariant differential of some connection $\Gamma$ on $Q\to \mathbb R$. Given bundle coordinates $(t,q^i)$ on $Q$ and the adapted coordinates $(t,q^i,q^i_t)$ on a first-order jet manifold $J^1Q$, a first-order dynamic equation reads

$$q^i_t=\Gamma (t,q^i).$$

For instance, this is the case of Hamiltonian non-autonomous mechanics.

A second-order dynamic equation

$$q^i_{tt}=\xi^i(t,q^j,q^j_t)$$

on $Q\to\mathbb R$ is defined as a holonomic connection $\xi$ on a jet bundle $J^1Q\to\mathbb R$. This equation also is represented by a connection on an affine jet bundle $J^1Q\to Q$. Due to the canonical embedding $J^1Q\to TQ$, it is equivalent to a geodesic equation on the tangent bundle $TQ$ of $Q$. A free motion equation in non-autonomous mechanics exemplifies a second-order non-autonomous dynamic equation.

== See also ==
- Autonomous system (mathematics)
- Non-autonomous mechanics
- Free motion equation
- Relativistic system (mathematics)
