= Relativistic mechanics =

Theory of motion and forces for objects close to the speed of light

In physics, relativistic mechanics refers to mechanics compatible with special relativity (SR) and general relativity (GR). It provides a non-quantum mechanical description of a system of particles, or of a fluid, in cases where the velocities of moving objects are comparable to the speed of light c. As a result, classical mechanics is extended correctly to particles traveling at high velocities and energies, and provides a consistent inclusion of electromagnetism with the mechanics of particles. This was not possible in Galilean relativity, where it would be permitted for particles and light to travel at any speed, including faster than light. The foundations of relativistic mechanics are the postulates of special relativity and general relativity. The unification of SR with quantum mechanics is relativistic quantum mechanics, while attempts for that of GR is quantum gravity, an unsolved problem in physics.

As with classical mechanics, the subject can be divided into "kinematics"; the description of motion by specifying positions, velocities and accelerations, and "dynamics"; a full description by considering energies, momenta, and angular momenta and their conservation laws, and forces acting on particles or exerted by particles. There is however a subtlety; what appears to be "moving" and what is "at rest"—which is termed by "statics" in classical mechanics—depends on the relative motion of observers who measure in frames of reference.

Some definitions and concepts from classical mechanics do carry over to SR, such as force as the time derivative of momentum (Newton's second law), the work done by a particle as the line integral of force exerted on the particle along a path, and power as the time derivative of work done. However, there are a number of significant modifications to the remaining definitions and formulae. SR states that motion is relative and the laws of physics are the same for all experimenters irrespective of their inertial reference frames. In addition to modifying notions of space and time, SR forces one to reconsider the concepts of mass, momentum, and energy all of which are important constructs in Newtonian mechanics. SR shows that these concepts are all different aspects of the same physical quantity in much the same way that it shows space and time to be interrelated.

The equations become more complicated in the more familiar three-dimensional vector calculus formalism, due to the nonlinearity in the Lorentz factor, which accurately accounts for relativistic velocity dependence and the speed limit of all particles and fields. However, they have a simpler and elegant form in four-dimensional spacetime, which includes flat Minkowski space (SR) and curved spacetime (GR), because three-dimensional vectors derived from space and scalars derived from time can be collected into four vectors, or four-dimensional tensors. The six-component angular momentum tensor is sometimes called a bivector because in the 3D viewpoint it is two vectors (one of these, the conventional angular momentum, being an axial vector).

== Relativistic kinematics ==
The relativistic four-velocity, that is the four-vector representing velocity in relativity, is defined as follows:

$$\boldsymbol{\mathbf{U}} = \frac{d \boldsymbol{\mathbf{X}}}{d \tau} = \left(\frac{c dt}{d\tau} , \frac{d\mathbf{x}}{d\tau} \right)$$

In the above, ${\tau}$ is the proper time of the path through spacetime, called the world-line, followed by the object velocity the above represents, and

$$\boldsymbol{\mathbf{X}} = (ct, \mathbf{x} )$$

is the four-position; the coordinates of an event. Due to time dilation, the proper time is the time between two events in a frame of reference where they take place at the same location. The proper time is related to coordinate time t by:

$$\frac{d \tau}{d t} = \frac{1}{\gamma(\mathbf{v})}$$

where ${\gamma}(\mathbf{v})$ is the Lorentz factor:

$$\gamma(\mathbf{v}) = \frac{1}{\sqrt{1 - \mathbf{v}\cdot\mathbf{v}/c^2}}\,\rightleftharpoons\,\gamma(v) = \frac{1}{\sqrt{1 - (v/c)^2}}.$$

(either version may be quoted) so it follows:

$$\boldsymbol{\mathbf{U}} = \gamma(\mathbf{v}) (c, \mathbf{v})$$

The first three terms, excepting the factor of ${\gamma(\mathbf{v})}$, is the velocity as seen by the observer in their own reference frame. The ${\gamma(\mathbf{v})}$ is determined by the velocity $\mathbf{v}$ between the observer's reference frame and the object's frame, which is the frame in which its proper time is measured. This quantity is invariant under Lorentz transformation, so to check to see what an observer in a different reference frame sees, one simply multiplies the velocity four-vector by the Lorentz transformation matrix between the two reference frames.

== Relativistic dynamics ==
=== Rest mass and relativistic mass ===
The mass of an object as measured in its own frame of reference is called its rest mass or invariant mass and is sometimes written $m_0$. If an object moves with velocity $\mathbf{v}$ in some other reference frame, the quantity $m=\gamma(\mathbf{v}) m_0$ is often called the object's "relativistic mass" in that frame. Some authors use $m$ to denote rest mass, but for the sake of clarity this article will follow the convention of using $m$ for relativistic mass and $m_0$ for rest mass.

Lev Okun has suggested that the concept of relativistic mass "has no rational justification today" and should no longer be taught. Other physicists, including Wolfgang Rindler and T. R. Sandin, contend that the concept is useful. See mass in special relativity for more information on this debate.

A particle whose rest mass is zero is called massless. Photons and gravitons are thought to be massless, and neutrinos are nearly so.

=== Relativistic energy and momentum ===
There are a couple of (equivalent) ways to define momentum and energy in SR. One method uses conservation laws. If these laws are to remain valid in SR they must be true in every possible reference frame. However, if one does some simple thought experiments using the Newtonian definitions of momentum and energy, one sees that these quantities are not conserved in SR. One can rescue the idea of conservation by making some small modifications to the definitions to account for relativistic velocities. It is these new definitions which are taken as the correct ones for momentum and energy in SR.

The four-momentum of an object is straightforward, identical in form to the classical momentum, but replacing 3-vectors with 4-vectors:

$$\boldsymbol{\mathbf{P}} = m_0 \boldsymbol{\mathbf{U}} = (E/c, \mathbf{p})$$

The energy and momentum of an object with invariant mass $m_0$, moving with velocity $\mathbf{v}$ with respect to a given frame of reference, are respectively given by

$$\begin{align}
E &= \gamma(\mathbf{v}) m_0 c^2 \\
\mathbf{p} &= \gamma(\mathbf{v}) m_0 \mathbf{v}
\end{align}$$

The factor $\gamma$ comes from the definition of the four-velocity described above. The appearance of $\gamma$ may be stated in an alternative way, which will be explained in the next section.

The kinetic energy, $K$, is defined as (see #Kinetic energy)

$$K = (\gamma - 1) m_0 c^2 = E - m_0 c^2 \,,$$

and the speed as a function of kinetic energy is given by

$$v = c \sqrt{1- \left(\frac{m_0 c^2}{K+m_0 c^2}\right)^2} = \frac {c \sqrt {K (K + 2 m_0 c ^ 2)}} {K + m_0 c^2} = \frac {c \sqrt {(E - m_0 c^2)(E + m_0 c ^ 2)}}{E} = \frac{p c^2}{E} \,.$$

The spatial momentum may be written as $\mathbf{p} = m \mathbf{v}$, preserving the form from Newtonian mechanics with relativistic mass substituted for Newtonian mass. However, this substitution fails for some quantities, including force and kinetic energy. Moreover, the relativistic mass is not invariant under Lorentz transformations, while the rest mass is. For this reason, many people prefer to use the rest mass and account for $\gamma$ explicitly through the 4-velocity or coordinate time.

A simple relation between energy, momentum, and velocity may be obtained from the definitions of energy and momentum by multiplying the energy by $\mathbf{v}$, multiplying the momentum by $c^2$, and noting that the two expressions are equal. This yields

$$\mathbf{p} c^2 = E \mathbf{v}$$

$\mathbf{v}$ may then be eliminated by dividing this equation by $c$ and squaring,

$$(pc)^2 = E^2 (v/c)^2$$

dividing the definition of energy by $\gamma$ and squaring,

$$E^2 \left(1 - (v/c)^2\right)  = \left(m_0 c^2\right)^2$$

and substituting:

$$E^2 - (p c)^2 = \left(m_0 c^2\right)^2$$

This is the relativistic energy–momentum relation.

While the energy $E$ and the momentum $\mathbf{p}$ depend on the frame of reference in which they are measured, the quantity $E^2 - (p c)^2$ is invariant. Its value is $-c^2$ times the squared magnitude of the 4-momentum vector.

The invariant mass of a system may be written as

$${m_0}_\text{tot} = \frac {\sqrt{E_\text{tot}^2 - (p_\text{tot}c)^2}} {c^2}$$

Due to kinetic energy and binding energy, this quantity is different from the sum of the rest masses of the particles of which the system is composed. Rest mass is not a conserved quantity in special relativity, unlike the situation in Newtonian physics. However, even if an object is changing internally, so long as it does not exchange energy or momentum with its surroundings, its rest mass will not change and can be calculated with the same result in any reference frame.

=== Mass–energy equivalence ===
The relativistic energy–momentum equation holds for all particles, even for massless particles for which m_{0} = 0. In this case:

$$E = pc$$

When substituted into Ev = c^{2}p, this gives v = c: massless particles (such as photons) always travel at the speed of light.

Notice that the rest mass of a composite system will generally be slightly different from the sum of the rest masses of its parts since, in its rest frame, their kinetic energy will increase its mass and their (negative) binding energy will decrease its mass. In particular, a hypothetical "box of light" would have rest mass even though made of particles which do not since their momenta would cancel.

Looking at the above formula for invariant mass of a system, one sees that, when a single massive object is at rest (v = 0, p = 0), there is a non-zero mass remaining: m_{0} = E/c^{2}. The corresponding energy, which is also the total energy when a single particle is at rest, is referred to as "rest energy". In systems of particles which are seen from a moving inertial frame, total energy increases and so does momentum. However, for single particles the rest mass remains constant, and for systems of particles the invariant mass remain constant, because in both cases, the energy and momentum increases subtract from each other, and cancel. Thus, the invariant mass of systems of particles is a calculated constant for all observers, as is the rest mass of single particles.

=== The mass of systems and conservation of invariant mass ===
For systems of particles, the energy–momentum equation requires summing the momentum vectors of the particles:

$$E^2 - \mathbf{p}\cdot\mathbf{p} c^2 = m_0^2 c^4$$

The inertial frame in which the momenta of all particles sums to zero is called the center of momentum frame. In this special frame, the relativistic energy–momentum equation has p = 0, and thus gives the invariant mass of the system as merely the total energy of all parts of the system, divided by c^{2}

$$m_{0,\,{\rm system}} = \sum_n E_n/c^2$$

This is the invariant mass of any system which is measured in a frame where it has zero total momentum, such as a bottle of hot gas on a scale. In such a system, the mass which the scale weighs is the invariant mass, and it depends on the total energy of the system. It is thus more than the sum of the rest masses of the molecules, but also includes all the totaled energies in the system as well. Like energy and momentum, the invariant mass of isolated systems cannot be changed so long as the system remains totally closed (no mass or energy allowed in or out), because the total relativistic energy of the system remains constant so long as nothing can enter or leave it.

An increase in the energy of such a system which is caused by translating the system to an inertial frame which is not the center of momentum frame, causes an increase in energy and momentum without an increase in invariant mass. E = m_{0}c^{2}, however, applies only to isolated systems in their center-of-momentum frame where momentum sums to zero.

Taking this formula at face value, we see that in relativity, mass is simply energy by another name (and measured in different units). In 1927 Einstein remarked about special relativity, "Under this theory mass is not an unalterable magnitude, but a magnitude dependent on (and, indeed, identical with) the amount of energy."

=== Closed (isolated) systems ===
In a "totally-closed" system (i.e., isolated system) the total energy, the total momentum, and hence the total invariant mass are conserved. Einstein's formula for change in mass translates to its simplest ΔE = Δmc^{2} form, however, only in non-closed systems in which energy is allowed to escape (for example, as heat and light), and thus invariant mass is reduced. Einstein's equation shows that such systems must lose mass, in accordance with the above formula, in proportion to the energy they lose to the surroundings. Conversely, if one can measure the differences in mass between a system before it undergoes a reaction which releases heat and light, and the system after the reaction when heat and light have escaped, one can estimate the amount of energy which escapes the system.

==== Chemical and nuclear reactions ====
In both nuclear and chemical reactions, such energy represents the difference in binding energies of electrons in atoms (for chemistry) or between nucleons in nuclei (in atomic reactions). In both cases, the mass difference between reactants and (cooled) products measures the mass of heat and light which will escape the reaction, and thus (using the equation) give the equivalent energy of heat and light which may be emitted if the reaction proceeds.

In chemistry, the mass differences associated with the emitted energy are around 10^{−9} of the molecular mass. However, in nuclear reactions the energies are so large that they are associated with mass differences, which can be estimated in advance, if the products and reactants have been weighed (atoms can be weighed indirectly by using atomic masses, which are always the same for each nuclide). Thus, Einstein's formula becomes important when one has measured the masses of different atomic nuclei. By looking at the difference in masses, one can predict which nuclei have stored energy that can be released by certain nuclear reactions, providing important information which was useful in the development of nuclear energy and, consequently, the nuclear bomb. Historically, for example, Lise Meitner was able to use the mass differences in nuclei to estimate that there was enough energy available to make nuclear fission a favorable process. The implications of this special form of Einstein's formula have thus made it one of the most famous equations in all of science.

==== Center of momentum frame ====
The equation E = m_{0}c^{2} applies only to isolated systems in their center of momentum frame. It has been popularly misunderstood to mean that mass may be converted to energy, after which the mass disappears. However, popular explanations of the equation as applied to systems include open (non-isolated) systems for which heat and light are allowed to escape, when they otherwise would have contributed to the mass (invariant mass) of the system.

Historically, confusion about mass being "converted" to energy has been aided by confusion between mass and "matter", where matter is defined as fermion particles. In such a definition, electromagnetic radiation and kinetic energy (or heat) are not considered "matter". In some situations, matter may indeed be converted to non-matter forms of energy (see above), but in all these situations, the matter and non-matter forms of energy still retain their original mass.

For isolated systems (closed to all mass and energy exchange), mass never disappears in the center of momentum frame, because energy cannot disappear. Instead, this equation, in context, means only that when any energy is added to, or escapes from, a system in the center-of-momentum frame, the system will be measured as having gained or lost mass, in proportion to energy added or removed. Thus, in theory, if an atomic bomb were placed in a box strong enough to hold its blast, and detonated upon a scale, the mass of this closed system would not change, and the scale would not move. Only when a transparent "window" was opened in the super-strong plasma-filled box, and light and heat were allowed to escape in a beam, and the bomb components to cool, would the system lose the mass associated with the energy of the blast. In a 21 kiloton bomb, for example, about a gram of light and heat is created. If this heat and light were allowed to escape, the remains of the bomb would lose a gram of mass, as it cooled. In this thought-experiment, the light and heat carry away the gram of mass, and would therefore deposit this gram of mass in the objects that absorb them.

=== Angular momentum ===
In relativistic mechanics, the time-varying mass moment

$$\mathbf{N} = m \left( \mathbf{x} - t \mathbf{v} \right)$$

and orbital 3-angular momentum

$$\mathbf{L} = \mathbf{x}\times \mathbf{p}$$

of a point-like particle are combined into a four-dimensional bivector in terms of the 4-position X and the 4-momentum P of the particle:

$$\mathbf{M} = \mathbf{X}\wedge\mathbf{P}$$

where ∧ denotes the exterior product. This tensor is additive: the total angular momentum of a system is the sum of the angular momentum tensors for each constituent of the system. So, for an assembly of discrete particles one sums the angular momentum tensors over the particles, or integrates the density of angular momentum over the extent of a continuous mass distribution.

Each of the six components forms a conserved quantity when aggregated with the corresponding components for other objects and fields.

=== Force ===
In special relativity, Newton's second law does not hold in the form F = ma, but it does if it is expressed as

$$\mathbf{F} = \frac{d\mathbf{p}}{dt}$$

where p = γ(v)m_{0}v is the momentum as defined above and m_{0} is the invariant mass. Thus, the force is given by

$$\mathbf{F} = \gamma^3 m_0 \, \mathbf{a}_\parallel + \gamma m_0 \, \mathbf{a}_\perp \ \mathrm{where } \ \gamma = \gamma(\mathbf{v})$$

Derivation

Starting from

$$\mathbf{F} = m_0 \frac{d(\gamma(\mathbf{v}) \, \mathbf{v})}{dt} = m_0 \left( \frac{d \gamma(\mathbf{v})}{dt} \, \mathbf{v} + \gamma(\mathbf{v}) \frac{d\mathbf{v}}{dt} \right).$$

Carrying out the derivatives gives

$$\mathbf{F} = \frac{\gamma(\mathbf{v})^3 m_0}{c^2} \left( \mathbf{v} \cdot \mathbf{a} \right) \, \mathbf{v} + \gamma(\mathbf{v}) m_0\, \mathbf{a}.$$

If the acceleration is separated into the part parallel to the velocity (a_{∥}) and the part perpendicular to it (a_{⊥}), so that:

$$\mathbf{a} = \mathbf{a}_\parallel + \mathbf{a}_\perp\,,\quad \mathbf{v}\cdot\mathbf{a}_\perp = 0 \,,\quad \mathbf{v}\cdot\mathbf{a} = \mathbf{v}\cdot\mathbf{a}_\parallel \,,$$

one gets

$$\mathbf{F} = \frac{\gamma(\mathbf{v})^3 m_0}{c^2} \left( \mathbf{v} \cdot \mathbf{a}_\parallel \right) \, \mathbf{v} + \gamma(\mathbf{v}) m_0\, (\mathbf{a}_\perp + \mathbf{a}_\parallel ) \, .$$

By construction a_{∥} and v are parallel, so (v·a_{∥})v is a vector with magnitude v^{2}a_{∥} in the direction of v (and hence a_{∥}) which allows the replacement:

$$(\mathbf{v}\cdot\mathbf{a}_\parallel) \mathbf{v} = v^2 \mathbf{a}_\parallel$$

then

$$\begin{align}
\mathbf{F} & = \frac{\gamma(\mathbf{v})^3 m_0 v^{2}}{c^2} \, \mathbf{a}_{\parallel} + \gamma(\mathbf{v}) m_0 \, (\mathbf{a}_{\parallel} + \mathbf{a}_{\perp})\\
& = \gamma(\mathbf{v})^3 m_0 \left( \frac{v^2}{c^2} + \frac{1}{\gamma(\mathbf{v})^2} \right) \mathbf{a}_{\parallel} + \gamma(\mathbf{v}) m_0 \, \mathbf{a}_{\perp} \\
& = \gamma(\mathbf{v})^3 m_0 \left( \frac{v^{2}}{c^2} + 1 - \frac{v^{2}}{c^2} \right) \mathbf{a}_{\parallel} + \gamma(\mathbf{v}) m_0 \, \mathbf{a}_{\perp} \\
& = \gamma(\mathbf{v})^3 m_0 \, \mathbf{a}_{\parallel} + \gamma(\mathbf{v}) m_0 \, \mathbf{a}_{\perp}
\end{align}\,$$

Consequently, in some old texts, γ(v)^{3}m_{0} is referred to as the longitudinal mass, and γ(v)m_{0} is referred to as the transverse mass, which is numerically the same as the relativistic mass. See mass in special relativity.

If one inverts this to calculate acceleration from force, one gets

$$\mathbf{a} = \frac{1}{m_0 \gamma(\mathbf{v})} \left( \mathbf{F} - \frac{ ( \mathbf{v} \cdot \mathbf{F} ) \mathbf{v} }{c^2} \right) \,.$$

The force described in this section is the classical 3-D force which is not a four-vector. This 3-D force is the appropriate concept of force since it is the force which obeys Newton's third law of motion. It should not be confused with the so-called four-force which is merely the 3-D force in the comoving frame of the object transformed as if it were a four-vector. However, the density of 3-D force (linear momentum transferred per unit four-volume) is a four-vector (density of weight +1) when combined with the negative of the density of power transferred.

=== Torque ===
The torque acting on a point-like particle is defined as the derivative of the angular momentum tensor given above with respect to proper time:

$$\boldsymbol{\Gamma} = \frac{d \mathbf{M}}{d\tau} = \mathbf{X}\wedge \mathbf{F}$$

or in tensor components:

$$\Gamma_{\alpha\beta} = X_\alpha F_\beta - X_\beta F_\alpha$$

where F is the 4d force acting on the particle at the event X. As with angular momentum, torque is additive, so for an extended object one sums or integrates over the distribution of mass.

=== Kinetic energy ===
The work-energy theorem says the change in kinetic energy is equal to the work done on the body. In special relativity:

$$\begin{align}
\Delta K = W = [\gamma_1 - \gamma_0] m_0c^2.\end{align}$$

Derivation

$$\begin{align}
\Delta K = W &= \int_{\mathbf{x}_0}^{\mathbf{x}_1} \mathbf{F} \cdot d\mathbf{x} \\
&= \int_{t_0}^{t_1} \frac{d}{dt}(\gamma m_0 \mathbf{v})\cdot\mathbf{v}dt \\
&= \left. \gamma m_0 \mathbf{v} \cdot \mathbf{v} \right|^{t_1}_{t_0} - \int_{t_0}^{t_1} \gamma m_0\mathbf{v} \cdot \frac{d\mathbf{v}}{dt} dt \\
&= \left. \gamma m_0 v^2 \right|^{t_1}_{t_0} - m_0\int_{v_0}^{v_1} \gamma v\,dv \\
&= m_0 \left( \left. \gamma v^2 \right|^{t_1}_{t_0} - c^2\int_{v_0}^{v_1} \frac{2v/c^2}{2\sqrt{1-v^2/c^2}}\,dv \right) \\
&= \left. m_0\left(\frac {v^2}{\sqrt{1-v^2/c^2}} + c^2 \sqrt{1-v^2/c^2} \right) \right|^{t_1}_{t_0} \\
&= \left. \frac {m_0c^2}{\sqrt{1-v^2/c^2}} \right|^{t_1}_{t_0} \\
&= \left. {\gamma m_0c^2}\right|^{t_1}_{t_0} \\
&= \gamma_1 m_0c^2 - \gamma_0 m_0c^2.\end{align}$$

If in the initial state the body was at rest, so v_{0} = 0 and γ_{0}(v_{0}) = 1, and in the final state it has speed v_{1} = v, setting γ_{1}(v_{1}) = γ(v), the kinetic energy is then;

$$K = [\gamma(v) - 1]m_0 c^2\,,$$

a result that can be directly obtained by subtracting the rest energy m_{0}c^{2} from the total relativistic energy γ(v)m_{0}c^{2}.

=== Newtonian limit ===
The Lorentz factor γ(v) can be expanded into a Taylor series or binomial series for (v/c)^{2} < 1, obtaining:

$$\gamma = \dfrac{1}{\sqrt{1 - (v/c)^2}} = \sum_{n=0}^{\infty} \left(\dfrac{v}{c}\right)^{2n}\prod_{k=1}^n \left(\dfrac{2k - 1}{2k}\right) = 1 + \dfrac{1}{2} \left(\dfrac{v}{c}\right)^2 + \dfrac{3}{8} \left(\dfrac{v}{c}\right)^4 + \dfrac{5}{16} \left(\dfrac{v}{c}\right)^6 + \cdots$$

and consequently

$$E - m_0 c^2 = \frac{1}{2} m_0 v^2 + \frac{3}{8} \frac{m_0 v^4}{c^2} + \frac{5}{16} \frac{m_0 v^6}{c^4} + \cdots ;$$
$$\mathbf{p} = m_0 \mathbf{v} + \frac{1}{2} \frac{m_0 v^2 \mathbf{v}}{c^2} + \frac{3}{8} \frac{m_0 v^4 \mathbf{v}}{c^4} + \frac{5}{16} \frac{m_0 v^6 \mathbf{v}}{c^6} + \cdots .$$

For velocities much smaller than that of light, one can neglect the terms with c^{2} and higher in the denominator. These formulas then reduce to the standard definitions of Newtonian kinetic energy and momentum. This is as it should be, for special relativity must agree with Newtonian mechanics at low velocities.

== See also ==
- Twin paradox
- Relativistic equations
- Relativistic heat conduction
- Classical electromagnetism and special relativity
- Relativistic system (mathematics)
- Relativistic Lagrangian mechanics
