= Non-autonomous mechanics =

Non-autonomous mechanics describe non-relativistic mechanical systems subject to time-dependent transformations. In particular, this is the case of mechanical systems whose Lagrangians and Hamiltonians depend on the time. The configuration space of non-autonomous mechanics is a fiber bundle $Q\to \mathbb R$ over the time axis $\mathbb R$ coordinated by $(t,q^i)$.

This bundle is trivial, but its different trivializations $Q=\mathbb R\times M$ correspond to the choice of different non-relativistic reference frames. Such a reference frame also is represented by a connection $\Gamma$ on $Q\to\mathbb R$ which takes a form $\Gamma^i =0$ with respect to this trivialization. The corresponding covariant differential $(q^i_t-\Gamma^i)\partial_i$ determines the relative velocity with respect to a reference frame $\Gamma$.

As a consequence, non-autonomous mechanics (in particular, non-autonomous Hamiltonian mechanics) can be formulated as a covariant classical field theory (in particular covariant Hamiltonian field theory) on $X=\mathbb R$. Accordingly, the velocity phase space of non-autonomous mechanics is the jet manifold $J^1Q$ of $Q\to \mathbb R$ provided with the coordinates $(t,q^i,q^i_t)$. Its momentum phase space is the vertical cotangent bundle $VQ$ of $Q\to \mathbb R$ coordinated by $(t,q^i,p_i)$ and endowed with the canonical Poisson structure. The dynamics of Hamiltonian non-autonomous mechanics is defined by a Hamiltonian form $p_idq^i-H(t,q^i,p_i)dt$.

One can associate to any Hamiltonian non-autonomous system an equivalent Hamiltonian autonomous system on the cotangent bundle $TQ$ of $Q$ coordinated by $(t,q^i,p,p_i)$ and provided with the canonical symplectic form; its Hamiltonian is $p-H$.

== See also ==
- Analytical mechanics
- Non-autonomous system (mathematics)
- Hamiltonian mechanics
- Symplectic manifold
- Covariant Hamiltonian field theory
- Free motion equation
- Relativistic system (mathematics)
