= Analysis of flows =

In theoretical physics, an analysis of flows is the study of "gauge" or "gaugelike" "symmetries" (i.e. flows the formulation of a theory is invariant under). It is generally agreed that flows indicate nothing more than a redundancy in the description of the dynamics of a system, but often, it is simpler computationally to work with a redundant description.

== Flows in classical mechanics ==
=== Flows in the action formalism ===
Classically, the action is a functional on the configuration space. The on-shell solutions are given by the variational problem of extremizing the action subject to boundary conditions.

While the boundary is often ignored in textbooks, it is crucial in the study of flows. Suppose we have a "flow", i.e. the generator of a smooth one-dimensional group of transformations of the configuration space, which maps on-shell states to on-shell states while preserving the boundary conditions. Because of the variational principle, the action for all of the configurations on the orbit is the same. This is not the case for more general transformations which map on shell to on shell states but change the boundary conditions.

Here are several examples. In a theory with translational symmetry, timelike translations are not flows because in general they change the boundary conditions. However, now take the case of a simple harmonic oscillator, where the boundary points are at a separation of a multiple of the period from each other, and the initial and final positions are the same at the boundary points. For this particular example, it turns out there is a flow. Even though this is technically a flow, this would usually not be considered a gauge symmetry because it is not local.

Flows can be given as derivations over the algebra of smooth functionals over the configuration space. If we have a flow distribution (i.e. flow-valued distribution) such that the flow convolved over a local region only affects the field configuration in that region, we call the flow distribution a gauge flow.

Given that we are only interested in what happens on shell, we would often take the quotient by the ideal generated by the Euler–Lagrange equations, or in other words, consider the equivalence class of functionals/flows which agree on shell.

=== Flows in the Hamiltonian formalism ===
- First class constraints
- Second class constraints
- BRST formalism
- Batalin–Vilkovisky formalism
