= Constraint =

Constraint may refer to:

- Constraint (computer-aided design), a demarcation of geometrical characteristics between two or more entities or solid modeling bodies
- Constraint (mathematics), a condition of an optimization problem that the solution must satisfy
- Constraint (mechanics), a relation between coordinates and momenta
- Constraint (computational chemistry)
- Constraint (information theory), the degree of statistical dependence between or among variables
- Constraints (journal), a scientific journal
- Constraint (database), a concept in relational database

== Particular types of constraint ==
- Biological constraints, factors which make populations resistant to evolutionary change
- Carrier's constraint on lung function in long thin animals
- Finite domain constraint, in mathematical solution-finding
- Integrity constraints in databases
  - Check constraint
  - Foreign key constraint
- Specific types of mechanical constraints:
  - First-class constraint and second-class constraint in Hamiltonian mechanics
  - Primary constraint, secondary constraint, etc. in Hamiltonian mechanics
  - Holonomic constraints, also called integrable constraints, (depending on time and the coordinates but not on the momenta)
  - Nonholonomic constraints
  - Pfaffian constraint
  - Scleronomic constraint (not depending on time)
  - Rheonomic constraint (depending on time)

== See also ==
- Constrained optimization, in finance, linear programming, economics and cost modeling
- Constrained writing, in literature
- Constraint algorithm, such as SHAKE, or LINCS
- Constraint programming
- Constraint logic programming
- Constraint satisfaction, in computer science
- Constraint satisfaction problem
- Loading gauge, a constraint in engineering
- Optimality theory, in linguistics, a constraint-based theory which is primarily influential in phonology
- Restraint (disambiguation)
- Structure gauge, a constraint in engineering
- Theory of constraints, in business management
