= Inverse dynamics-based static optimization =

Inverse dynamics-based static optimization is a method for estimating muscle-tendon forces from the measured (e.g. through gait analysis) kinematics of a given body part. It exploits the concepts of inverse dynamics and static optimization (in opposition to dynamic programming). Joint moments are obtained by inverse dynamics and then, knowing muscular moment arms, a static optimization process is carried on to evaluate optimal single-muscle forces for the system

$\textbf{T}_{MT}=R(\textbf{q})\textbf{F}_{MT}$

which is an underdetermined system.

== General concepts ==
We can solve the inverse dynamics of a system to obtain joint torques and nonetheless be unable to estimate the forces exerted by single muscles even knowing the exact geometry of our joints and muscles due to the redundancy of our system. Through an optimization approach we could find a way to understand how our central nervous system chooses its control strategies so as to optimize some aspects of movement production (e.g. minimizing metabolic cost).

=== Dynamic equations of motion ===
We use here the matricial form of the equations of motion

$M(\textbf{q})\ddot{\textbf{q}} +\textbf{C}(\textbf{q},\dot{\textbf{q}}) + \textbf{G}(\textbf{q}) + \textbf{E} + \textbf{T}_{MT}=0$

in which we are considering a body part with $j$ joints and $m$ muscles. Then

- $\textbf{q},\dot{\textbf{q}},\ddot{\textbf{q}}$ are the vectors of generalized coordinates, general velocities and general accelerations ($j \times 1$);
- $M(\textbf{q})$ is the mass matrix ($j \times j$);
- $\textbf{C}(\textbf{q},\dot{\textbf{q}})$ is the vector of centrifugal and Coriolis forces ($j \times 1$);
- $\textbf{G}(\textbf{q})$ is the vector of gravitational forces ($j \times 1$);
- $\textbf{E}$ is the vector of external forces ($j \times 1$);
- $\textbf{T}_{MT}$ is the vector of muscle-tendon torques ($j \times 1$).

The vector of muscle-tendon torques can be further decomposed as follows

$\textbf{T}_{MT} = R(\textbf{q})\textbf{F}_{MT}$

in which

- $R(\textbf{q})$ is the muscle-arm matrix ($j \times m$);
- $\textbf{F}_{MT}$ is the vector of muscle-tendon forces ($m \times 1$).

=== The static optimization process ===
Once we obtain $\textbf{T}_{MT}$, suppose $R(\textbf{q})$ known from anatomo-physiological studies and that we can't obtain analytically muscle-tendon forces due to the redundancy of the system. Then we hypothesize that the actual muscle forces minimize a given cost function, $\Phi(\textbf{F}_{MT})$, subject to equality and inequality constraints. We have then to solve

$$\left\{ \begin{aligned} &\min \Phi(\textbf{F}_{MT}) \\ &f'(\textbf{F}_{MT})=0 \\ &g'(\textbf{F}_{MT}) \leq 0\end{aligned} \right.$$

Usually this is written as

$$\left\{ \begin{aligned} &\min \Phi(\textbf{F}_{MT}) \\ &\textbf{T}_{MT} = R(\textbf{q})\textbf{F}_{MT} \\ &\textbf{0} \leq \textbf{F}_{MT} \leq \textbf{F}_{MT,0} \\ &f'(\textbf{F}_{MT})=0 \\ &g'(\textbf{F}_{MT}) \leq 0\end{aligned} \right.$$

in which

- $\textbf{F}_{MT,0}$ is the maximum isometric force.

==== The choice of the cost function ====
Our choice of the cost function is based on the supposed optimization mechanisms carried on by our CNS. It needs to be clinically validated, especially in unhealthy patients. In [Erdemir, 2007] a list of possible cost functions with a brief rationale and the suggested model validation technique is available.

==== Clarification on the use of the maximum isometric force ====
Muscle contraction can be eccentric (velocity of contraction $v<0$), concentric ($v >0$) or isometric ($v=0$). From muscle force-velocity characteristic we notice that muscle force in an eccentric contraction is higher than the maximum isometric force, why then do we use it as a constraint on muscle force? Mainly for two reasons:

- Rarely do muscle contraction occur with total activation ($a=1$), then eccentric contraction force is lowered proportionally to the value of activation;
- The maximum isometric force is a remarkable and fixed value of force given the physiological cross-sectional area of a muscle (they are linked by the concept of specific tension of a muscle).
