= Monogenic system =

Type of system in classical mechanics

In classical mechanics, a physical system is termed a monogenic system if the force acting on the system can be modelled in a particular, especially convenient mathematical form. The systems that are typically studied in physics are monogenic. The term was introduced by Cornelius Lanczos in his book The Variational Principles of Mechanics (1970).

In Lagrangian mechanics, the property of being monogenic is a necessary condition for certain different formulations to be mathematically equivalent. If a physical system is both a holonomic system and a monogenic system, then it is possible to derive Lagrange's equations from d'Alembert's principle; it is also possible to derive Lagrange's equations from Hamilton's principle.

== Mathematical definition ==
In a physical system, if all forces, with the exception of the constraint forces, are derivable from the generalized scalar potential, and this generalized scalar potential is a function of generalized coordinates, generalized velocities, or time, then, this system is a monogenic system.

Expressed using equations, the exact relationship between generalized force $\mathcal{F}_i$ and generalized potential $\mathcal{V}(q_1, q_2, \dots, q_N, \dot{q}_1, \dot{q}_2, \dots, \dot{q}_N, t)$ is as follows:

$\mathcal{F}_i = - \frac{\partial \mathcal{V}}{\partial q_i} + \frac{d}{dt} \left(\frac{\partial \mathcal{V}}{\partial \dot{q_i}}\right);$

where $q_i$ is generalized coordinate, $\dot{q_i}$ is generalized velocity, and $t$ is time.

If the generalized potential in a monogenic system depends only on generalized coordinates, and not on generalized velocities and time, then, this system is a conservative system. The relationship between generalized force and generalized potential is as follows:

$\mathcal{F}_i= - \frac{\partial \mathcal{V}}{\partial q_i}.$

== See also ==
- Scleronomous
