= Pfaffian constraint =

In dynamics, a Pfaffian constraint is a way to describe a dynamical system in the form:

$\sum_{s=1}^nA_{rs}du_s + A_rdt = 0;\; r = 1,\ldots, L$

where $L$ is the number of equations in a system of constraints, and $A_{rs}, A_r$ are functions of $t, u_1, \dots, u_n$ only. In other words, it is a 1-form on $\R^{1+n}$.

== Types ==
A Pfaffian constraint is integrable iff it is holonomic. Otherwise, it is non-integrable or nonholonomic.

A Pfaffian constraint is scleronomous, or scleronomic, iff the coefficients $A_{rs}, A_r$ do not depend on time. Otherwise, it is rheonomous, or rheonomic.

A Pffafian constraint is catastatic iff $A_r = 0$. Otherwise, it is acatastatic.

These together produce 8 types of Pffafian constraints, all of which are possible: {non-integrable, integrable} × {scleronomous, rheonomous} × {catastatic, acatastatic}.

A Pffafian constraint system is scleronomous/catastic iff all its constraints are scleronomous/catastic.

Pfaffian constraints are named after Johann Friedrich Pfaff, who studied the problem of Pfaff: Find the necessary and sufficient conditions for a Pfaffian constraint system to be integrable. In 1815, Pfaff published a general way to integrate first-order partial differential equations (PDE). The idea was to convert such a PDE in $n$ variables to a 1-form $\omega$ in $\lceil n/2\rceil$ variables, then integrate $\omega$. This problem was important in the development of modern differential geometry. Milestones include (Clebsch, 1866), (Frobenius, 1877), (Darboux, 1882), (Cartan, 1899). See integrability conditions for differential systems for the solution.

The problem of Pfaff is nontrivial, because it is possible for two individually non-holonomic constraints to together create a holonomic constraint system. For example, on $\R^3$, the 1-forms $dy - zdx = 0$ and $dy - (z+1) dx = 0$ are both contact forms, thus maximally non-integrable, but a system containing both of them is integrable. Its integral manifolds are precisely the lines parallel to the z-axis.

=== Holonomic constraint ===
Given a holonomic system described by a set of holonomic constraint equations

$$f_r(u_1, u_2, u_3,\ldots, u_n, t) = 0;\; r = 1,\ldots, L$$

where $\{ u_1, u_2, u_3, \ldots, u_n \}$ are the n generalized coordinates that describe the system, and where $L$ is the number of equations in a system of constraints, we can differentiate by the chain rule for each equation:

$$\sum_{s=1}^n\frac{\partial f_r}{\partial u_s}du_s + \frac{\partial f_r}{\partial t}dt = 0;\; r = 1,\ldots, L$$

A Pfaffian constraint can be plotted as a field of surfaces of size

=== Nonholonomic constraint ===
If the constraint is nonholonomic, but first-order in the velocity, then it can also be written in Pfaffian form. That is, if in each
$$f_r(u_1, u_2, u_3,\ldots, u_n, \dot u_1, \dots, \dot u_n, t) = 0;\; r = 1,\ldots, L$$
the terms involving $\dot u$ are linear in them, then it is a Pfaffian constraint. For example, $\dot u_1 \cos u_3 - \dot u_2 \sin u_3 - 1 = 0$ is equivalent to $du_1 \cos u_3 - du_2 \sin u_3 - dt = 0$.

=== Non-Pfaffian constraint ===
If the constraint is not first-order in velocity, then it is not a Pfaffian constraint in general. For example, the constant-speed constraint $\dot u_1^2 + \dot u_2^2 - 1 = 0$ is not Pfaffian. Similarly, $\dot u_1\dot u_2 - 1 = 0$ is not Pfaffian.

If the constraint is an inequality, then it is not Pfaffian. For example, the constraint for a pendulum with a soft string of length $L$ is $x^2 + y^2 \leq L^2$.

If the constraint is not smooth, then it is not Pfaffian.

If the constraint is not restricted to position and velocity, then it is not Pfaffian in general. However, it might turn out to be equivalent to one. For example, consider a particle moving on the plane. If it is constrained to have constant curvature then $\ddot{y} \dot{x}-\ddot{x} \dot{y}=\kappa\left(\dot{x}^2+\dot{y}^2\right)^{3 / 2}$, and it involves acceleration. However if we require the particle to have smooth and nonzero velocity, then it in fact moves on a circle, and thus it is a holonomic constraint.

== Examples ==
=== Pendulum ===
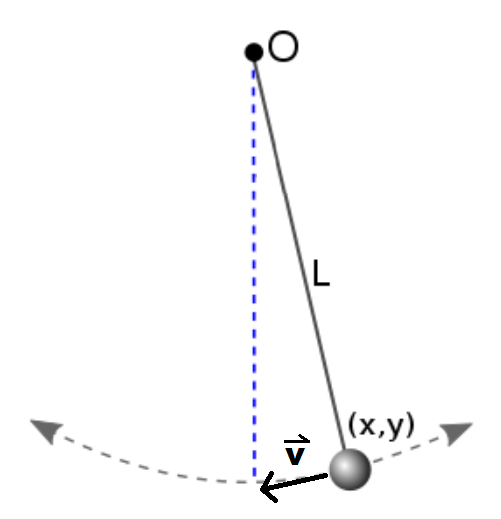
A pendulum

Consider a pendulum. Because of how the motion of the weight is constrained by the arm, the velocity vector $\overrightarrow{V}$ of the weight must be perpendicular at all times to the position vector $\overrightarrow{L}$. Because these vectors are always orthogonal, their dot product must be zero. Both position and velocity of the mass can be defined in terms of an $x$-$y$ coordinate system:

$$\overrightarrow{L}\cdot\overrightarrow{V}=\begin{bmatrix}x \\y \end{bmatrix}\cdot\begin{bmatrix}\dot{x} \\\dot{y} \end{bmatrix} = 0$$

Simplifying the dot product yields:

$$x\dot{x} + y\dot{y} = x\frac{\text{d}x}{\text{d}t} + y\frac{\text{d}y}{\text{d}t} = 0$$

We multiply both sides by $\text{d}t$. This results in the Pfaffian form of the constraint equation:

$$x \text{d}x + y \text{d}y = 0$$

This Pfaffian form is useful, as we may integrate it to solve for the holonomic constraint equation of the system, if one exists. In this case, the integration is rather trivial:

$$\int x \text{d}x + \int y \text{d}y = 0 = x^2+y^2+C$$

Where C is the constant of integration.

And conventionally, we may write:

$$x^2+y^2=L^2$$

The term $L^2$ is squared simply because it must be a positive number; being a physical system, dimensions must all be real numbers. Indeed, $L$ is the length of the pendulum arm.

=== Robotics ===
In robot motion planning, a Pfaffian constraint is a set of k linearly independent constraints linear in velocity, i.e., of the form
$$A(q) \, \dot q = 0$$
One source of Pfaffian constraints is rolling without slipping in wheeled robots.

=== Rolling wheel ===
An upright wheel on a plane (sometimes visualized as a unicycle or a rolling upright coin) is a nonholonomic system with a single Pfaffian constraint.

Let $\theta$ is the steering angle relative to the $x$-axis, and $x$ and $y$ be the location where the wheel touches the plane. Since the wheel can only move in the direction it is pointing towards, we obtain the constraint $\dot x \sin\theta - \dot y \cos\theta = 0$. As a 1-form, the constraint is $\omega := dx \sin\theta - d y \cos\theta$.
