= Restraint =

Restraint may refer to:

== A form of control ==
- Restraint, or self-control, a personal virtue
- Medical restraint, form of general physical restraint used for medical purposes
- Physical restraint, the practice of rendering people helpless or keeping them in captivity by means such as handcuffs, ropes, straps, etc.

== Arts, entertainment, and media ==
- Restraint (book), a non-fiction book on international relations by Barry Posen
- Restraint (2008 film), an Australian thriller directed by David Deenan
- Restraint (2017 film), an American horror directed by Adam Cushman
- "Restraint", a song from Florence + the Machine's 2022 album Dance Fever

== Legal terminology ==
- Judicial restraint, a theory of judicial interpretation that encourages judges to limit the exercise of their own power
- Prior restraint, a government's actions that prevent materials from being distributed
- Restraint on alienation, in property law, a clause that seeks to prohibit the recipient of property from transferring his or her interest
- Restraint of trade, a restriction on a person's freedom to conduct business
- Vertical restraints, agreements between firms or individuals at different levels of the production and distribution process

== See also ==
- Constraint (disambiguation)
