= Nonholonomic system =

Type of optimization problem

A nonholonomic system in classical mechanics is a physical system with some constraints and mostly more than two constraints that are impossible to be cast into the form of holonomic constraints. That is, a nonholonomic system is a system that is not a holonomic system. Intuitively stated, they are mechanical systems with constraints on their velocity that are not derivable from position constraints. They are contrasted with classical Lagrangian and Hamiltonian systems, in which there are only constraints on position.

== Definitions ==
A system is a holonomic system if and only if all its constraints are Pfaffian and integrable. A system is a nonholonomic system, if and only if all its constraints are Pfaffian, but some are not integrable. A system with non-Pfaffian constraint does not have a standard name.

=== Pfaffian constraint ===
In general, consider a system whose state is fully specified by $q = (q_1, \dots, q_n)$. Its evolution over time is constrained, in that only certain velocities are allowed, and others are disallowed.

Consider an upright wheel on a plane. Let $\theta$ be the steering angle relative to the $x$-axis, and $x$ and $y$ be the location where the wheel touches the plane. Since the wheel can only move in the direction it is pointing towards, we obtain the constraint $\dot x \sin\theta - \dot y \cos\theta = 0$. The constraint is rewritten into a 1-form as $\omega := dx \sin\theta - d y \cos\theta$.

In general, a constraint that can be written as a 1-form in the $(n+1)$-dimensional space of $(t, q_1, \dots, q_n)$ is called a Pfaffian constraint. Otherwise it is a non-Pfaffian constraint.

=== Integrability ===
Nonholonomic Pfaffian constraints are given by nonintegrable distributions; i.e., taking the Lie bracket of two vector fields in such a distribution may give rise to a vector field not contained in this distribution.

Geometrically, a system of integrable Pfaffian constraints is integrable: one can foliate the whole configuration space into submanifolds of maximal dimension, such that a trajectory satisfies all constraints if and only if the trajectory stays within a submanifold. See integrability conditions for differential systems for how to decide whether a system of Pfaffian constraints.

In the special case of upright wheel on a plane, the single constraint is not integrable, because it is a contact form:
$$\omega \wedge d\omega = -\mathrm{d} x \wedge \mathrm{d} y \wedge \mathrm{d} \theta \neq 0$$
For a system with holonomic constraints, its dynamics is restricted to a submanifold of the full configuration space. Therefore, we can make a coordinate chart only on an individual submanifold, which then allows us to eliminate the constraints, since any trajectory within an individual submanifold automatically satisfy all constraints. The coordinate chart on that is called generalized coordinates and is the foundation of Lagrangian mechanics. Nonholonomic constraints cannot be eliminated by using generalized coordinates.

== Examples ==
=== Rolling sphere ===
Consider a unit sphere rolling without slipping on a plane. The configuration space of the system is 5-dimensional: 2 for the point of contact, 3 for the orientation of the sphere, which is SO(3). The no-slip condition means that even though there are 5 dimensions of configuration, the velocity at any point in configuration space is restricted to a 2-dimensional subspace. It is thus a Pfaffian constraint system with 3 constraints.

The constraints are not integrable, because any configuration is reachable from any other. To see this, note that the configuration space can be constructed as a SO(3)-principal bundle over $\R^2$, so it remains to show that the holonomy group is all of SO(3).

By rolling in a square of side length $\pi /2$, the sphere returns to the starting point, but the point of contact would be rotated by $\pi /2$. This allows changing the point of contact to any point on the great circle perpendicular to the previous point of contact. Applying this construction twice, we see that the holonomy group can rotate any point to any other point on the unit sphere (that is, it is transitive). The only closed subgroup of SO(3) that satisfy this is SO(3) itself.

Despite being nonholonomic, certain problems of the rolling sphere can be solved in closed form by directly using Newton's laws in vector form.

=== Frictionless wheel ===
Consider a wheel suspended on a frictionless axis. The axis remains perpendicular over a curved surface. The configuration has 3 dimensions: $x, y$ for location, and $\theta$ for angle of the wheel. The system has a single constraint which describes the parallel transport of $\theta$ as $x, y$ changes. If the surface has nonzero Gaussian curvature, then the constraint is nonholonomic, because any change of $\theta$ can be effected by moving $x, y$ around particular loops.

This case in particular shows a clear connection between nonholonomic constraints and the holonomy group in differential geometry.

Although, note that in the case, the same system can be modelled as a Lagrangian (or Hamiltonian) mechanical system without constraints. The nontrivial holonomy group can be produced by a gauge-like coupling term $\dot{\theta} A_i(x) \dot{x}^i$ in the Lagrangian $\frac{1}{2} m g_{i j}(x) \dot{x}^i \dot{x}^j+\frac{1}{2} I \dot{\theta}^2+\dot{\theta} A_i(x) \dot{x}^i$. So in this case, whether the system is truly "nonholonomic" is a matter of modeling choice.

=== Chaplygin sleigh ===
The Chaplygin sleigh is a rigid body frictionlessly sliding on the plane. It touches the plane at 2 points and a knife edge. The two points can slide in any direction, but the knife edge can only slide in the direction parallel to its edge. In terms of constraint, it is exactly the same as the rolling upright wheel. However, it differs from it in that the sleigh has both mass and moment of inertia.

=== Robotics ===
In robotics, nonholonomic has been studied in the scope of motion planning and feedback linearization for mobile robots. It is related to underactuation, because in underactuation, one can control a system with $d$ degrees of freedom using less than $d$ control variables, similar to how rolling a sphere in 2 dimensions allows reaching the entire 5-dimensional configuration space.

== Relation to holonomy ==
The concept of non/holonomy in mechanics is related to holonomy in differential geometry, specifically of connections. In general, given a system of constraints, it is nonholonomic if it corresponds to a geometric structure with a connection with nontrivial holonomy group, and vice versa. Note that despite what etymology suggests, a non-holonomic system corresponds to a geometric structure with nontrivial holonomy.

Similarly, the concept of non/holonomy in mechanics is related to geometric phases, since those are also described by nontrivial holonomy in connections.

== History ==
N. M. Ferrers first suggested to extend the equations of motion with nonholonomic constraints in 1871. He introduced the expressions for Cartesian velocities in terms of generalized velocities.

In 1877, Edward Routh wrote the equations with the Lagrange multipliers. In the third edition of his book for linear non-holonomic constraints of rigid bodies, he introduced the form with multipliers, which is now called the Lagrange equations of the second kind with multipliers.

This term "holonomic system" was introduced by Heinrich Hertz in 1894.

Ein materielles System, zwischen dessen möglichen Lagen alle denkbaren stetigen Übergänge zugleichauch mögliche Übergänge sind, heißt ein holonomes System. Der Name sollandeuten, dass ein solches System integralen Gesetzen gehorcht, während diemateriellen Systeme im allgemeinen nur Differentialgesetzen unterworfensind. [A material system between whose possible positions all conceivable continuous transitions are simultaneously possible transitions is called a holonomic system. The name indicates that such a system obeys integral laws, whereas material systems in general are subject only to differential laws.]

— Heinrich Hertz, Gesammelte Werke von Heinrich Hertz, vol. 3, Die Prinzipiender Mechanik (Leipzig: Metzger & Wittig, 1894), p. 91

In 1897, Sergey Chaplygin first suggested to form the equations of motion without Lagrange multipliers. Under certain linear constraints, he introduced on the left-hand side of the equations of motion a group of extra terms of the Lagrange-operator type. The remaining extra terms characterise the nonholonomicity of system and they become zero when the given constrains are integrable.

In 1901 P. V. Voronets generalised Chaplygin's work to the cases of noncyclic holonomic coordinates and of nonstationary constraints.

== See also ==
- Holonomic constraint
- Bicycle and motorcycle dynamics
- Falling cat problem
- Goryachev–Chaplygin top
- Parallel parking problem
- Pfaffian constraint
- Udwadia–Kalaba equation
- Lie group integrator
