= Scleronomous =

Mechanical system whose constraints are independent of time

A mechanical system is scleronomous if the equations of constraints do not contain the time as an explicit variable and the equation of constraints can be described by generalized coordinates. Such constraints are called scleronomic constraints. The opposite of scleronomous is rheonomous.

== Application ==
In 3D space, a particle with mass $m\,\!$, velocity $\mathbf{v}$ has kinetic energy $T$
$$T =\frac{1}{2}m v^2 .$$

Velocity is the derivative of position $r$ with respect to time $t\,\!$. Use chain rule for several variables:
$$\mathbf{v} = \frac{d\mathbf{r}}{dt} = \sum_i\ \frac{\partial \mathbf{r}}{\partial q_i} \dot{q}_i + \frac{\partial \mathbf{r}}{\partial t} .$$
where $q_i$ are generalized coordinates.

Therefore,
$$T = \frac{1}{2} m \left(\sum_i\ \frac{\partial \mathbf{r}}{\partial q_i}\dot{q}_i+\frac{\partial \mathbf{r}}{\partial t}\right)^2 .$$

Rearranging the terms carefully,

$$\begin{align}
T &= T_0 + T_1 + T_2 : \\[1ex]
T_0 &= \frac{1}{2} m \left(\frac{\partial \mathbf{r}}{\partial t}\right)^2 , \\
T_1 &= \sum_i\ m\frac{\partial \mathbf{r}}{\partial t}\cdot \frac{\partial \mathbf{r}}{\partial q_i}\dot{q}_i\,\!, \\
T_2 &= \sum_{i,j}\ \frac{1}{2}m\frac{\partial \mathbf{r}}{\partial q_i}\cdot \frac{\partial \mathbf{r}}{\partial q_j}\dot{q}_i\dot{q}_j,
\end{align}$$

where $T_0\,\!$, $T_1\,\!$, $T_2$ are respectively homogeneous functions of degree 0, 1, and 2 in generalized velocities. If this system is scleronomous, then the position does not depend explicitly with time:

$$\frac{\partial \mathbf{r}}{\partial t}=0.$$
Therefore, only term $T_2$ does not vanish:
$$T = T_2.$$
Kinetic energy is a homogeneous function of degree 2 in generalized velocities.

== Example: pendulum ==
A simple pendulum

As shown at right, a simple pendulum is a system composed of a weight and a string. The string is attached at the top end to a pivot and at the bottom end to a weight. Being inextensible, the string’s length is a constant. Therefore, this system is scleronomous; it obeys scleronomic constraint
$$\sqrt{x^2+y^2} - L = 0,$$
where $(x,y)$ is the position of the weight and $L$ is length of the string.

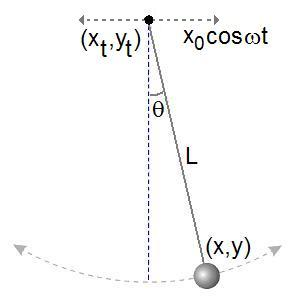
A simple pendulum with oscillating pivot point

Take a more complicated example. Refer to the next figure at right, Assume the top end of the string is attached to a pivot point undergoing a simple harmonic motion
$$x_t=x_0\cos\omega t ,$$

where $x_0$ is amplitude, $\omega$ is angular frequency, and $t$ is time.

Although the top end of the string is not fixed, the length of this inextensible string is still a constant. The distance between the top end and the weight must stay the same. Therefore, this system is rheonomous as it obeys constraint explicitly dependent on time
$$\sqrt{(x - x_0\cos\omega t)^2+y^2} - L = 0.$$

== See also ==
- Lagrangian mechanics
- Holonomic system
- Nonholonomic system
- Rheonomous
- Mass matrix
