= Rheonomous =

Mechanical system whose constraints are dependent on time

A mechanical system is rheonomous if its equations of constraints contain the time as an explicit variable. Such constraints are called rheonomic constraints. The opposite of rheonomous is scleronomous.

== Example: simple 2D pendulum ==
A simple pendulum

As shown at right, a simple pendulum is a system composed of a weight and a string. The string is attached at the top end to a pivot and at the bottom end to a weight. Being inextensible, the string has a constant length. Therefore, this system is scleronomous; it obeys the scleronomic constraint

$$\sqrt{x^2+y^2} - L=0\,\!$$,

where $(x,\ y)\,\!$ is the position of the weight and $L\,\!$ the length of the string.

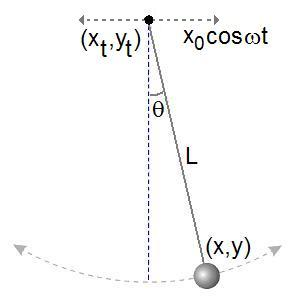
A simple pendulum with oscillating pivot point

The situation changes if the pivot point is moving, e.g. undergoing a simple harmonic motion

$$x_t=x_0\cos\omega t\,\!$$,

where $x_0\,\!$ is the amplitude, $\omega\,\!$ the angular frequency, and $t\,\!$ time.

Although the top end of the string is not fixed, the length of this inextensible string is still a constant. The distance between the top end and the weight must stay the same. Therefore, this system is rheonomous; it obeys the rheonomic constraint

$$\sqrt{(x - x_0\cos\omega t)^2+y^2} - L=0\,\!$$.

== See also ==
- Lagrangian mechanics
- Holonomic constraints
