= Young Suh Kim =

South Korean physicist, academic and author (1935–2025)

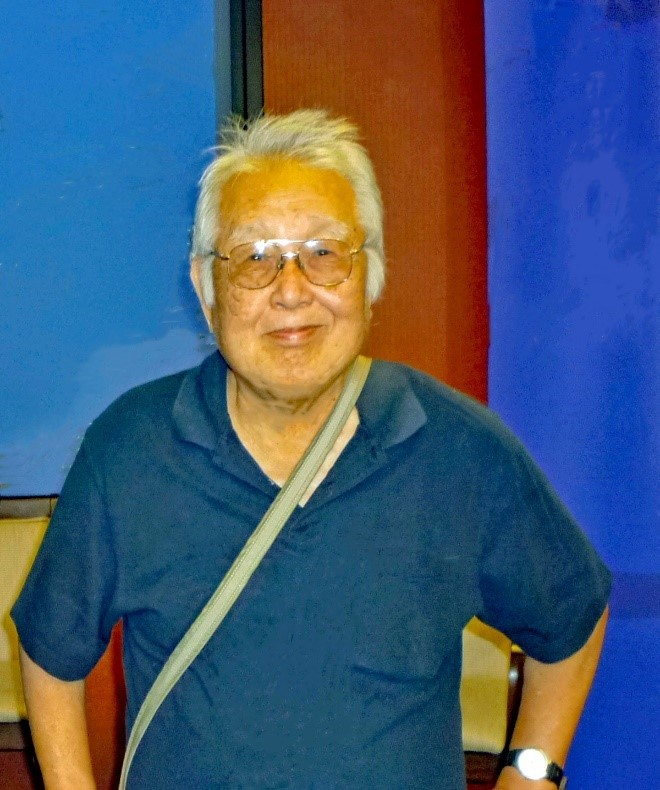
- Born: 12 May 1935; Korea, Empire of Japan
- Died: 25 October 2025 (aged 90)
- Education: Carnegie Institute of Technology (BS); Princeton University (PhD)
- Occupations: Physicist, academic, author and researcher
- Scientific career
- Fields: Quantum mechanics
- Workplaces: University of Maryland

Young Suh Kim (12 May 1935 – 25 October 2025) was a South Korean physicist, academic, author and researcher. He was a Professor Emeritus at the University of Maryland.

Kim focused his research on quantum mechanics in Einstein's relativistic world, particle theory, and optical sciences. He has authored several books, including Theory and Applications of the Poincaré Group, Phase Space Picture of Quantum Mechanics, Physics of the Lorentz Group, New Perspectives on Einstein's E = mc2, and Mathematical Devices for Optical Sciences.

He was an honored member of the International Association of Top Professionals (IAOTP).

Kim died on 25 October 2025, at the age of 90.

== Early life and education ==
Kim was born on 12 May 1935 in Korea, Empire of Japan. His family moved to Seoul (South Korea) in 1946. After high school graduation in Seoul, he moved to the United States in 1954 to become a freshman at the Carnegie Institute of Technology in Pittsburgh. There, Kim received his bachelor's degree in 1958. He then went to Princeton University for graduate study in physics. There, Kim received his PhD degree in 1961. He spent one additional year at Princeton as a postdoctoral fellow.

== Career ==
Following his post-doctoral fellowship, Kim was appointed as an assistant professor of physics at the University of Maryland in 1962. At the time, he was the youngest person to become assistant professor at the university. Kim was promoted to Associate Professor and to Full Professor of Physics later. In 2007, he became an Emeritus Professor of Physics at the University of Maryland.

== Research ==
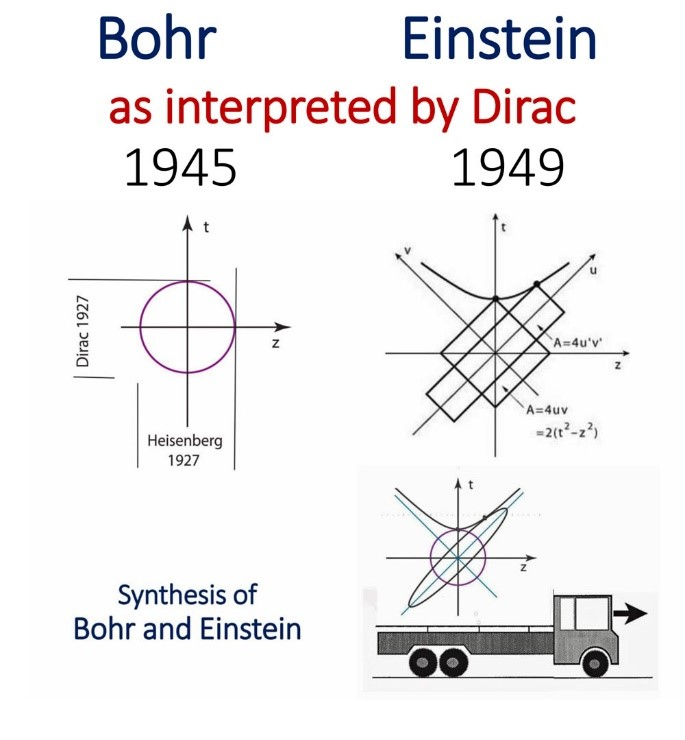

Kim's most significant contribution was to provide the resolution of the Bohr-Einstein issue of moving hydrogen atoms or moving bound states. Kim was not the first one to recognize the existence of this problem. Paul Dirac made his life-long efforts to construct the quantum mechanics of bound states (like the hydrogen atom) in Einstein's relativistic world. On this problem, Dirac published four important papers in 1927, 1945, 1949, and 1963. Kim integrated the first three of those four papers using the mathematical formalism provided by Eugene Wigner. In so doing, Kim provided the resolution to the Bohr-Einstein issue of the moving hydrogen atom, or quantum mechanics of moving bound states in Einstein's relativistic world.

=== Harmonic Oscillator Wave Functions for moving Bound States ===
In his study regarding quantum mechanics, Kim discussed the role of harmonic oscillators in dealing with bound states. He, together with Marilyn E. Noz, studied Murray Gell-Mann’s quark model, and highlighted that the oscillator wave function can explain the mass spectrum of similar particles observed in high-energy experiments. While following Paul Dirac's papers, he constructed the wave function for the moving bound state. This wave function is known as the "Lorentz-covariant harmonic oscillator wave function" or "Covariant oscillator wave function."

In 1977, Kim and Noz published a paper in the Physical Review discussing that the covariant oscillator wave function can synthesize the quarks and the partons. In 1989, Kim reinforced this result in his paper in Physical Review Letters. Kim also suggested the possibility to address the Bohr-Einstein issue of moving hydrogen atom with the synthesis of quarks and partons.

=== Einstein's Special Relativity derivable from Heisenberg's Uncertainty Brackets ===
In 1962, Dirac visited University of Maryland for one week and Kim was assigned to Dirac as a personal assistant during his visit. At the time, Dirac was working on his paper on the system of two harmonic oscillators. Kim thus had direct discussion with Dirac about the topic. Later, Kim described how Dirac's oscillator system leads to transformations in the five-dimensional space consisting of three-dimensional space of xyz coordinates, plus two time variables. He also focused the degrees of freedom in this oscillator system, and demonstrated the space-time symmetry of Einstein's special relativity with E=mc2. He studied Heisenberg's uncertainty relations for the two-oscillator system and discussed ten generators that satisfy the closed set of commutation relations. His studies suggested that this set can also serve as the closed set of commutators for the ten generators for the Lorentz group applicable to three space coordinates and two time variables if it is possible to contract the second time variables to convert them into four translation generators along the three space coordinates and along the first time variable.

=== Lorentz Group for Optical Sciences ===
Kim and his co-workers made heavy investments in the Lorentz group. They noted that Dirac's two-oscillator system is directly applicable to two-photons systems in quantum optics. The two-photon coherent state or the squeezed state of light is a representation of the Lorentz group and shares the same set of mathematical formulas with the Lorentz-covariant harmonic oscillators for moving bound states. Kim and his co-workers also explained how the Lorentz group is applicable to those instruments, including the laser cavities, multilayers, and polarization optics. On this subject, they published a book entitled Mathematical for Optical Sciences in 2019.

== Awards and honors ==
- 2020 - Academic Excellence Award, Top 100 Registry
- 2021 - Recognized among Top Scientists, Fortune Magazine
- 2021 - Lifetime Achievement Award, Marquis Who’s Who
- 2021 - Nominated in the timeline of Professional Milestones, Marquis Who's Who
- 2021 - Nominee, Who's Who Distinguished Leaders

== Bibliography ==
=== Books ===
- Theory and Applications of the Poincaré Group (1986) ISBN 9789027721419
- Phase Space Picture Of Quantum Mechanics: Group Theoretical Approach (1991) ISBN 9789814506670
- Physics of the Lorentz Group (2015) ISBN 9781681742540
- New Perspectives On Einstein's E = Mc2 (2018) ISBN 9789813237728
- Mathematical Devices for Optical Sciences (2019) ISBN 9780750319423
- Physics of the Lorentz Group, Second Edition (2021) ISBN 9780750336055

=== Selected articles ===
- Kim, Y.S. & Noz, M. E. (1973). Covariant Harmonic Oscillators and the Quark Model. Phys. Rev. D 8, 3521-3526
- Kim, Y.S. & Noz, M.E. (1977). Covariant Harmonic Oscillators and the Parton Picture. Phys. Rev. D15, 335–338.
- Kim, Y.S., Noz, M. E. & Oh, S. (1979). Representations of the Poincaré group for relativistic extended hadrons. J. Math. Phys. 20, 1341–1344.
- Han, D., Kim, Y.S., & Son, D. (1983). Gauge transformations as Lorentz-Boosted rotations. Physics Letters B 131, 327–329.
- Kim, Y.S. (1989). Observable Gauge Transformations in the Parton Picture. Phys. Rev. Lett. 63, 348–351.
- Kim, Y.S. & Wigner, E.P. (1990). Space-time Geometry of Relativistic Particles. J. Math. Phys. 31, 55–60.
- Baskal, S., Kim, Y.S, & Noz, M.E. (2019). Einstein's E = mc2 derivable from Heisenberg's Uncertainty Relations, Quantum Physics 1(2), 236–257.
- Baskal, S., Kim, Y.S, & Noz, M.E. (2019). Poincaré Symmetry from Heisenberg's Uncertainty Relations. Symmetry 11(3), 236–267.
