= Center for Theoretical Studies, University of Miami =

The University of Miami Center for Theoretical Studies was established in 1965 under the direction of Behram Kurşunoğlu, with guidance from J. Robert Oppenheimer and with the support of the University's President Henry King Stanford. The purpose of the Center was to provide a forum for studies in theoretical physics and related fields, to be carried out by short term visitors, postdoctoral researchers, long term members of the Center, and various faculty of the University. Among others, the long term resident members of the Center included Paul Dirac (1969–1972) and Lars Onsager (1972–1976), while the affiliated faculty included Physics Professors Arnold Perlmutter and Kursunoglu.

Soon after being established, the Center assumed responsibility for the organization of the "Coral Gables Conferences" --- a series of winter scientific meetings on various topics, especially elementary particle physics. These meetings had already begun in January 1964, and continued through December 2003. The original series has now been superseded by the annual Miami physics conferences on elementary particles, astrophysics, and cosmology.

From 1969 onwards the Center awarded the J. Robert Oppenheimer Memorial Prize to recognize physics research. Jocelyn Bell Burnell was the 1978 recipient for her discovery of pulsars. Several other recipients of the J. Robert Oppenheimer Memorial Prize were later awarded the Nobel Prize in Physics (specifically, Sheldon Glashow, Yoichiro Nambu, Frederick Reines, Abdus Salam, and Steven Weinberg). The inaugural recipient, Paul Dirac, was already a Nobel laureate.

The Center was located on the University of Miami's campus in Coral Gables, Florida. It closed in 1992 on the retirement of Kursunoglu and was then officially disestablished although the name was retained by the University for possible future use.
