= Paul Dirac =

British physicist (1902–1984)

Paul Dirac OM FRS
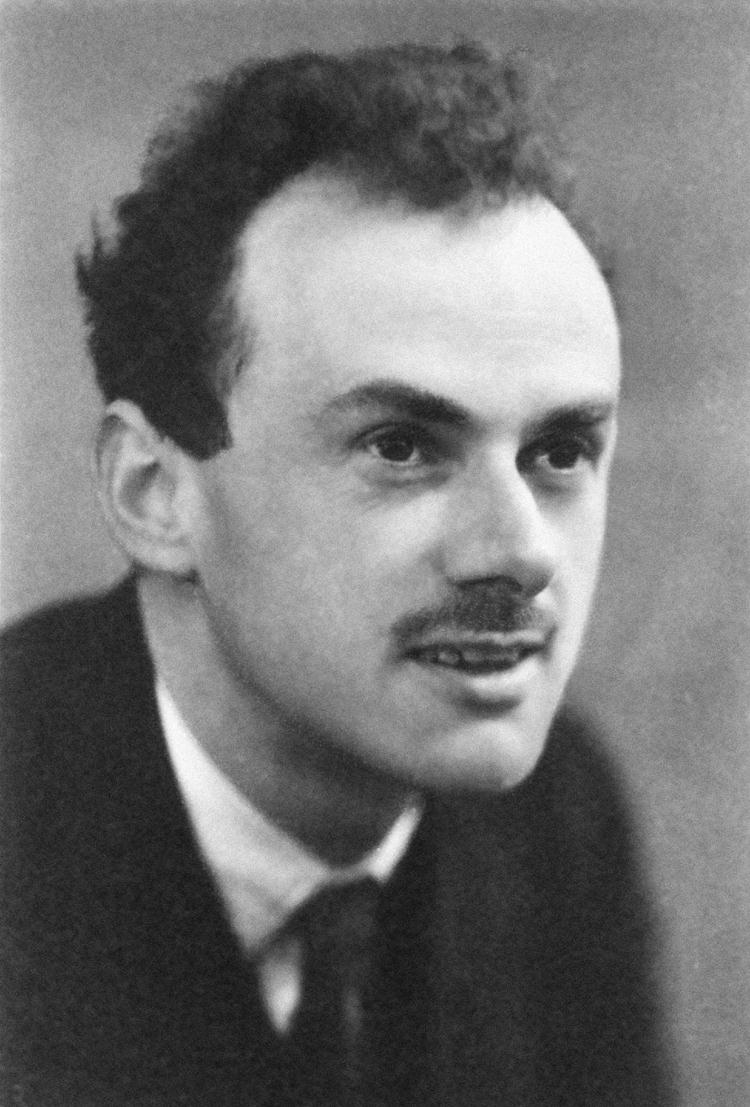
- Dirac in 1933
- Born: Paul Adrien Maurice Dirac; 8 August 1902; Bristol, England
- Died: 20 October 1984 (aged 82); Tallahassee, Florida, U.S.
- Citizenship: United Kingdom; Switzerland (until 1919)
- Education: University of Bristol (BSc, 1921; BA, 1923); St John's College, Cambridge (PhD, 1926)
- Known for: Dirac equation; Dirac large numbers hypothesis; Dirac membrane; Dirac operator; Kapitsa–Dirac effect; Fermi–Dirac statistics; Dirac–Born–Infeld action; Gravitational waves; Magnetic monopoles; Quantum electrodynamics
- Spouse: Margit Wigner (m. 1937)
- Children: 4 in total (2 stepchildren, including Gabriel)
- Relatives: Eugene Wigner (brother-in-law)
- Awards: Nobel Prize in Physics (1933); Royal Medal (1939); Copley Medal (1952); Max Planck Medal (1952); J. Robert Oppenheimer Memorial Prize (1969)
- Scientific career
- Fields: Physics
- Workplaces: University of Cambridge; Florida State University
- Thesis: Quantum Mechanics (1926)
- Doctoral advisor: Ralph Fowler
- Doctoral students: Harish-Chandra; Richard J. Eden; C. J. Eliezer; Behram Kurşunoğlu; Dennis Sciama

Paul Adrien Maurice Dirac (/dɪˈræk/ dih-RAK; 8 August 1902 – 20 October 1984) was an English theoretical physicist who was one of the founders of quantum mechanics. Dirac laid the foundations for quantum electrodynamics and quantum field theory. He was Lucasian Professor of Mathematics at the University of Cambridge from 1932 to 1969, and a professor of physics at Florida State University from 1970 to 1984. Dirac shared the 1933 Nobel Prize in Physics with Erwin Schrödinger "for the discovery of new productive forms of atomic theory."

Dirac graduated from the University of Bristol with a Bachelor of Science in Electrical Engineering in 1921, and a Bachelor of Arts in Mathematics in 1923. Dirac then graduated from St John's College, Cambridge, with a Doctor of Philosophy in Physics in 1926, writing the first ever thesis on quantum mechanics.

In 1928, Dirac formulated the Dirac equation, which connected special relativity and quantum mechanics, and predicted the existence of antimatter. The equation has been regarded by some physicists as "the real seed of modern physics". He contributed to Fermi–Dirac statistics, a theory which describes the behaviour of fermions, particles with half-integer spin. His 1930 monograph The Principles of Quantum Mechanics is one of the most influential texts on the subject.

Abdus Salam declared that "Dirac was undoubtedly one of the greatest physicists of this or any century ... No man except Einstein has had such a decisive influence, in so short a time, on the course of physics in this century." Stephen Hawking stated that "Dirac has done more than anyone this century, with the exception of Einstein, to advance physics and change our picture of the universe."

== Early life ==
Paul Adrien Maurice Dirac was born on 8 August 1902 at his parents' home in Bristol, England, and grew up in the Bishopston area of the city. His father, Charles Adrien Ladislas Dirac, was an immigrant from Saint-Maurice, Switzerland, of French descent, who worked in Bristol as a French teacher. His mother, Florence Hannah Holten, was born to a Cornish Methodist family in Liskeard, Cornwall. She was named after Florence Nightingale by her father, a ship's captain, who had met Nightingale while he was a soldier during the Crimean War. His mother moved to Bristol as a young woman, where she worked as a librarian at the Bristol Central Library; despite this she still considered her identity to be Cornish rather than English. Paul had a younger sister, Béatrice Isabelle Marguerite, known as Betty, and an older brother, Reginald Charles Félix, known as Felix, who died by suicide in March 1925. Dirac later recalled: "My parents were terribly distressed. I didn't know they cared so much ... I never knew that parents were supposed to care for their children, but from then on I knew."

Charles and the children were officially Swiss nationals until they became naturalised on 22 October 1919. Dirac's father was strict and authoritarian, although he disapproved of corporal punishment. Dirac had a strained relationship with his father, so much so that after his father's death, Dirac wrote, "I feel much freer now." Charles forced his children to speak to him and each other only in French so that they might learn the language. When Dirac found that he could not express what he wanted to say in French, he chose to remain silent.

== Education ==
Dirac was educated first at Bishop Road Primary School, where one of his peers was Cary Grant, and then at the all-boys Merchant Venturers' Technical College, where his father was a French teacher. The school was an institution attached to the University of Bristol, which shared grounds and staff. It taught science, mathematics, and modern languages at a time when secondary education in Britain was still dedicated largely to the classics, something for which Dirac would later express his gratitude.

After school, Dirac studied electrical engineering on a City of Bristol University Scholarship at the University of Bristol's engineering faculty, which was co-located with the Merchant Venturers' Technical College. Shortly before he completed his degree in 1921, he sat for the entrance examination for St John's College, Cambridge. He passed and was awarded a £70 scholarship, but this fell short of the amount of money required to live and study at Cambridge. Despite having graduated with a first class honours B.Sc. in electrical engineering, the economic climate of the post-war depression was such that he was unable to find work as an engineer. Instead, he took up an offer to study for a B.A. in mathematics at the University of Bristol free of charge. He was permitted to skip the first year of the course owing to his engineering degree. Under the influence of Peter Fraser, whom Dirac called the best mathematics teacher, he had the most interest in projective geometry, and began applying it to Hermann Minkowski's geometrical version of special relativity.

In 1923, Dirac graduated, once again with first class honours, and received a £140 scholarship from the Department of Scientific and Industrial Research. Along with his £70 scholarship from St John's College, this was enough to live at Cambridge. There, Dirac pursued his interests in the theory of general relativity, an interest he had gained earlier as a student in Bristol, and in the nascent field of quantum physics, under the supervision of Ralph Fowler. From 1925 to 1928, he held an 1851 Research Fellowship. He completed his Ph.D. in June 1926 with the first thesis on quantum mechanics to be submitted anywhere. He then continued his research in Copenhagen and Göttingen.

== Career ==
In the spring of 1929, he was a visiting professor at the University of Wisconsin–Madison. In August 1929, Dirac and Werner Heisenberg travelled together on the Shinyo Maru to Tokyo, where both held lectures.

From 1932 to 1969, Dirac was Lucasian Professor of Mathematics at the University of Cambridge. In 1934, he conceived the Helikon vortex isotope separation process. In 1937, he proposed a speculative cosmological model based on the large numbers hypothesis. During World War II, he conducted important theoretical work on uranium enrichment by gas centrifuge. He introduced the separative work unit (SWU) in 1941. He contributed to the Tube Alloys project, the British programme to research and construct atomic bombs during World War II.

=== Students ===
Dirac took on few research students, because he felt that his work on fundamental questions was not suitable for a PhD student.

His lectures on quantum theory were widely attended, even by visitors. In 1930, Subrahmanyan Chandrasekhar attended Dirac's course on quantum mechanics four times, describing it as "just like a piece of music you want to hear over and over again."

== Later life ==
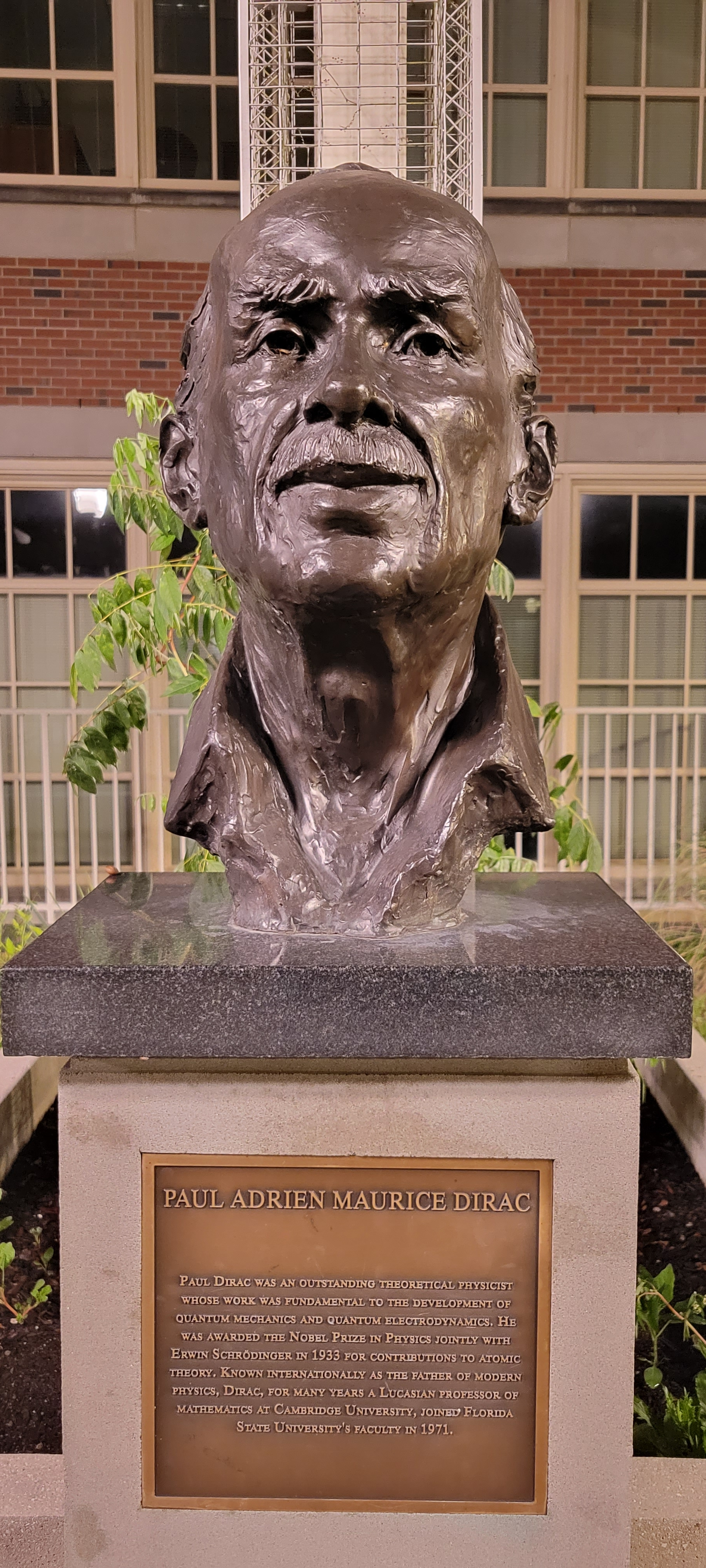
A bust of Paul Dirac at Florida State University

In 1969, Dirac was forced to retire from his chair at Cambridge, due to his age (67). Before his retirement, he was offered a visiting position at the University of Miami in Coral Gables, Florida; he accepted, joining its newly formed Center for Theoretical Studies. In September 1970 he also accepted a visiting professor position at Florida State University in Tallahassee, Florida, and moved his family to Tallahassee. He accepted a position at FSU as a full professor in 1972.

Contemporary accounts of his time in Tallahassee describe it as happy, except that he apparently found the summer heat oppressive and liked to escape from it to Cambridge. He would walk about a mile to work each day and was fond of swimming in one of the two nearby lakes (Silver Lake and Lost Lake), and was also more sociable than he had been at the University of Cambridge, where he mostly worked at home apart from giving classes and seminars. At Florida State, he would usually eat lunch with his colleagues before taking a nap.

Dirac published over 60 papers at FSU during those last twelve years of his life, including a short book on general relativity. His last paper (1984), entitled "The inadequacies of quantum field theory," contains his final judgment on quantum field theory: "These rules of renormalisation give surprisingly, excessively good agreement with experiments. Most physicists say that these working rules are, therefore, correct. I feel that is not an adequate reason. Just because the results happen to be in agreement with observation does not prove that one's theory is correct." The paper ends with the words: "I have spent many years searching for a Hamiltonian to bring into the theory and have not yet found it. I shall continue to work on it as long as I can and other people, I hope, will follow along such lines."

In 1975, Dirac gave a series of five lectures at the University of New South Wales which were subsequently published as a book, Directions in Physics (1978). He donated the royalties from this book to the university for the establishment of Dirac Lecture Series. The Silver Dirac Medal for the Advancement of Theoretical Physics is awarded by the University of New South Wales to commemorate the lecture.

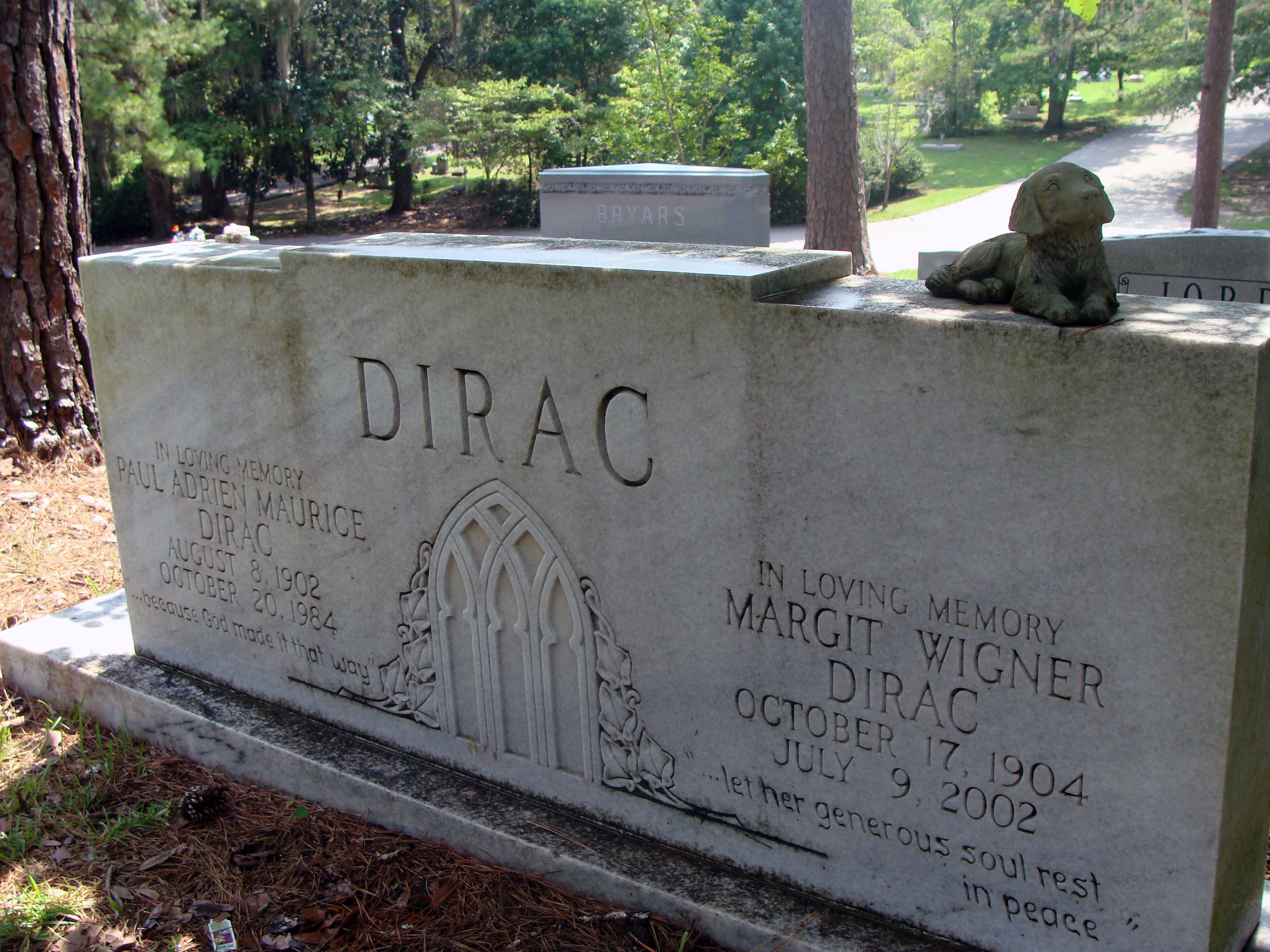
The tombstone of Dirac and his wife in Roselawn Cemetery, Tallahassee, Florida. Their daughter Mary Elizabeth Dirac, who died 20 January 2007, is buried next to them

Dirac died on 20 October 1984 in Tallahassee, Florida, at the age of 82, and was buried at Tallahassee's Roselawn Cemetery.

== Personal life ==
=== Family ===
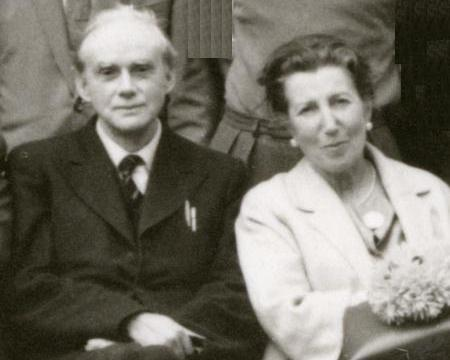
Paul and Margit Dirac in Copenhagen, July 1963

In 1937, Dirac married Margit Wigner, the sister of physicist Eugene Wigner and a divorcee. Dirac raised Margit's two children, Judith and Gabriel, as his own. Paul and Margit Dirac also had two daughters together, Mary Elizabeth and Florence Monica.

Margit, known as Manci, had visited her brother in 1934 in Princeton, New Jersey, from their native Hungary and, while at dinner at the Annex Restaurant, met the "lonely-looking man at the next table". This account from a Korean physicist, Y. S. Kim, who met and was influenced by Dirac, also says: "It is quite fortunate for the physics community that Manci took good care of our respected Paul A. M. Dirac. Dirac published eleven papers during the period 1939–46. Dirac was able to maintain his normal research productivity only because Manci was in charge of everything else".

=== Personality ===
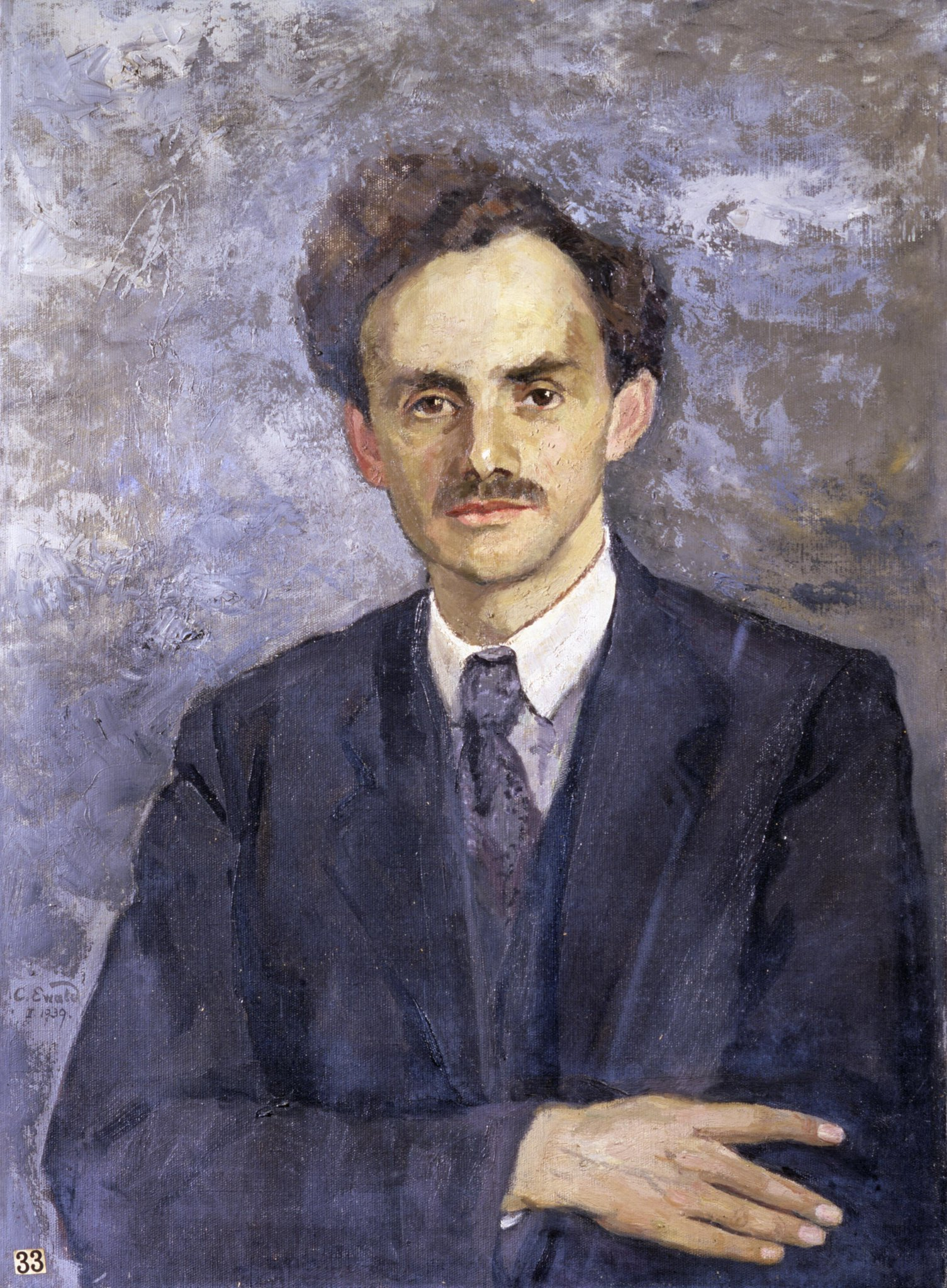
Portrait of Paul Dirac by Clara Ewald, 1939

Dirac was known among his colleagues for his precise and taciturn nature. His colleagues in Cambridge jokingly defined a unit called a "dirac", which was one word per hour. When Niels Bohr complained that he did not know how to finish a sentence in a scientific article he was writing, Dirac replied, "I was taught at school never to start a sentence without knowing the end of it." He criticised the physicist J. Robert Oppenheimer's interest in poetry: "The aim of science is to make difficult things understandable in a simpler way; the aim of poetry is to state simple things in an incomprehensible way. The two are incompatible." Bohr called Dirac "a complete logical genius" and also the "strangest man" who had ever visited his Institute.

Dirac himself wrote in his diary during his postgraduate years that he concentrated solely on his research, and stopped only on Sunday when he took long strolls alone.

Werner Heisenberg related the following anecdote about Dirac:

... Paul always thinks about his formulations very carefully. He does not like to answer spontaneously at once, he first thinks about things. We were on the steamer from America to Japan, and I liked to take part in the social life on the steamer and so, for instance, I took part in the dances in the evening. Paul, somehow, didn’t like that too much but he would sit in a chair and look at the dances. Once I came back from a dance and took the chair beside him and he asked me, ‘Heisenberg, why do you dance?’ I said ‘Well, when there are nice girls it is a pleasure to dance.’ He thought for quite a long time about it, and after about five minutes he said, ‘Heisenberg, how do you know beforehand that the girls are nice?’

I think this story characterizes at least one part of the mind of Dirac.

Margit Dirac told both George Gamow and Anton Capri in the 1960s that her husband had said to a house visitor, "Allow me to present Wigner's sister, who is now my wife."

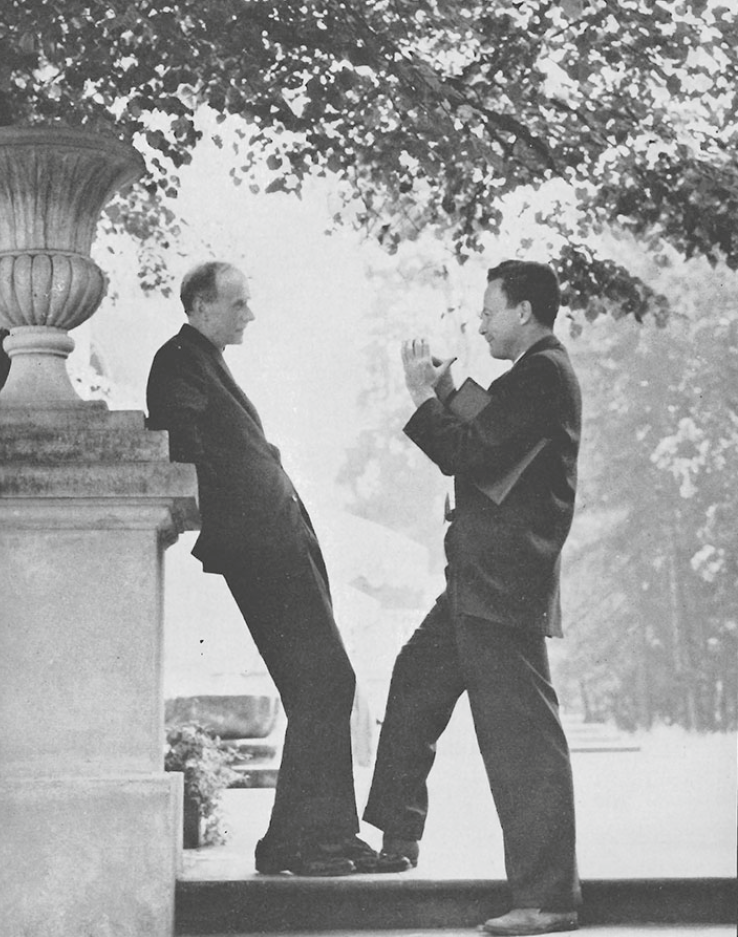
Paul Dirac and Richard Feynman at Jabłonna, Poland. July 1962.

Another story told of Dirac is that when he first met the young Richard Feynman at a conference, he said after a long silence, "I have an equation. Do you have one too?"

After he presented a lecture at a conference, one colleague raised his hand and said: "I don't understand the equation on the top-right-hand corner of the blackboard". After a long silence, the moderator asked Dirac if he wanted to answer the question, to which Dirac replied: "That was not a question, it was a comment."

Dirac was also noted for his personal modesty. He called the equation for the time evolution of a quantum-mechanical operator, which he was the first to write down, the "Heisenberg equation of motion". Most physicists speak of Fermi–Dirac statistics for half-integer-spin particles (fermions) and Bose–Einstein statistics for integer-spin particles (bosons). While lecturing later in life, Dirac always insisted on calling the former "Fermi statistics". He referred to the latter as "Bose statistics" for reasons, he explained, of "symmetry".

Dirac was known for his dread of journalists, and spent much effort in avoiding them.

=== Views on God ===
Later in life, in an article mentioning God that appeared in the May 1963 edition of Scientific American, Dirac wrote:

It seems to be one of the fundamental features of nature that fundamental physical laws are described in terms of a mathematical theory of great beauty and power, needing quite a high standard of mathematics for one to understand it. You may wonder: Why is nature constructed along these lines? One can only answer that our present knowledge seems to show that nature is so constructed. We simply have to accept it. One could perhaps describe the situation by saying that God is a mathematician of a very high order, and He used very advanced mathematics in constructing the universe. Our feeble attempts at mathematics enable us to understand a bit of the universe, and as we proceed to develop higher and higher mathematics we can hope to understand the universe better.

In 1971, at a conference meeting, Dirac described the possibilities for scientifically answering the question of God. Dirac explained that

... if physical laws are such that to start off life involves an excessively small chance so that it will not be reasonable to suppose that life would have started just by blind chance, then there must be a god,... On the other hand, if life can start very easily and does not need any divine influence, then I will say that there is no god.

== Research ==
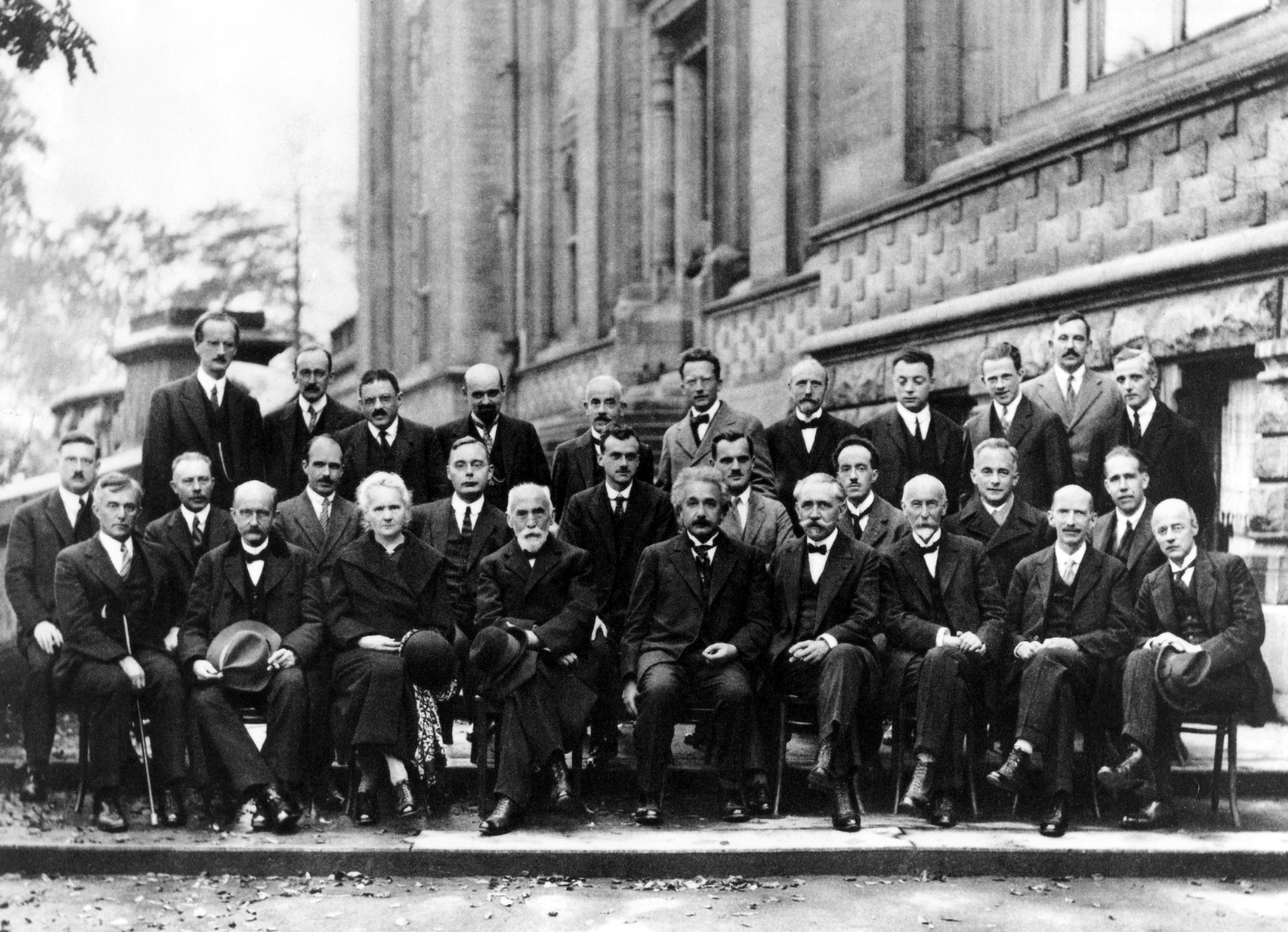
The 1927 Solvay Conference in Brussels, a gathering of the world's top physicists. Dirac is in the centre of the middle row, seated behind Albert Einstein.

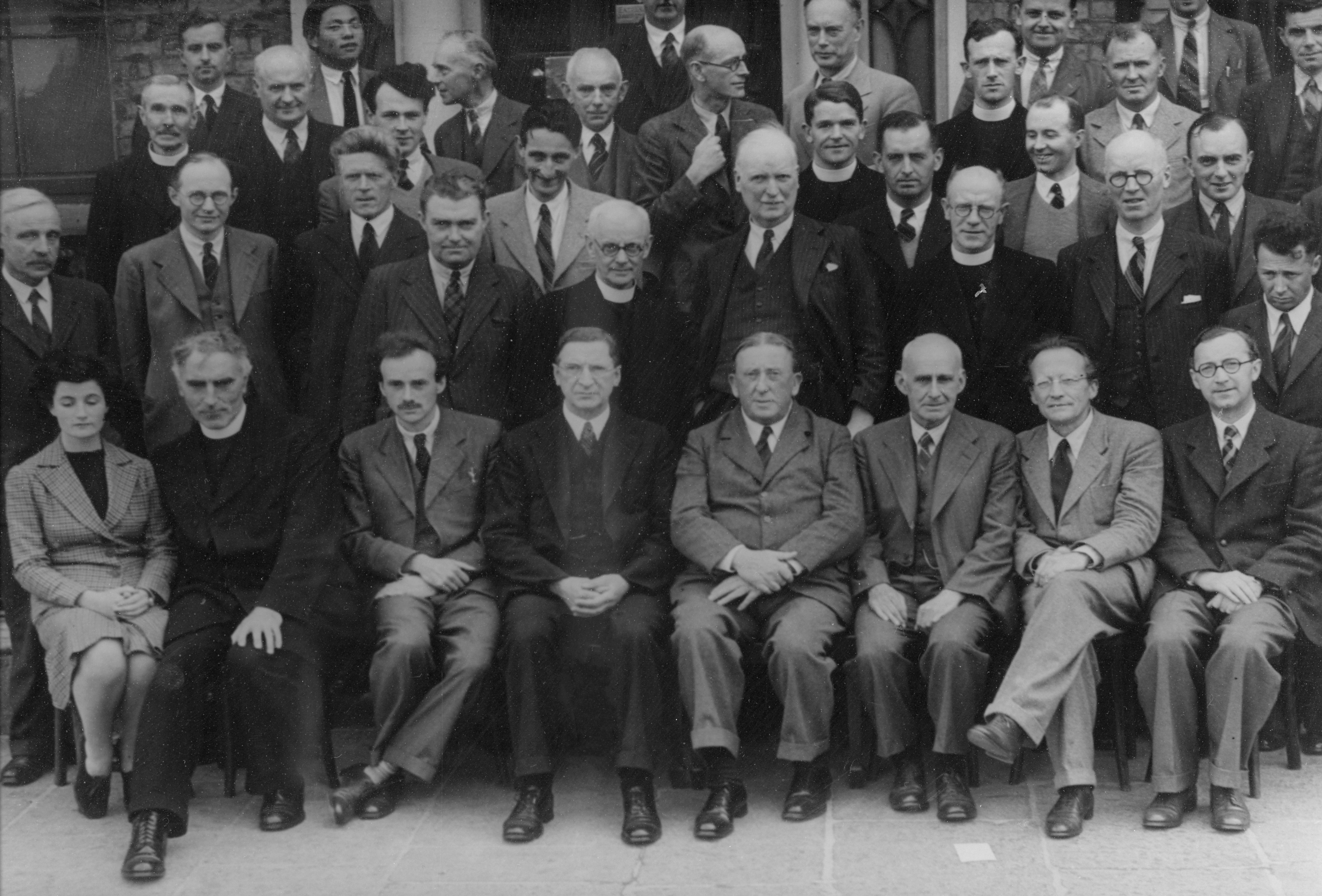
Dirac (front row 3rd from left), next to Éamon de Valera (front row 4th from left), Erwin Schrödinger (front row 2nd from right) at Dublin Institute for Advanced Studies in 1942

Dirac discovered the relativistic equation for the electron, which now bears his name. The remarkable notion of an antiparticle to each fermion particle – e.g. the positron as antiparticle to the electron – stems from his equation. He is credited as being the one to create quantum field theory, which underlies all theoretical work on sub-atomic or "elementary" particles today, work that is fundamental to our understanding of the forces of nature, alongside creating quantum electrodynamics and coining the term. He proposed and investigated the concept of a magnetic monopole, an object not yet known empirically, as a means of bringing even greater symmetry to James Clerk Maxwell's equations of electromagnetism. Dirac also coined the terms "fermion" (particles with half-integer spin) and "boson" (particles with whole-integer spin).

Throughout his career, Dirac was motivated by the principles of mathematical beauty, with Peter Goddard stating that "Dirac cited mathematical beauty as the ultimate criterion for selecting the way forward in theoretical physics". Dirac was recognised for being mathematically gifted, as during his time in university, academics had affirmed that Dirac had an "ability of the highest order in mathematical physics", with Ebenezer Cunningham stating that Dirac was "quite the most original student I have met in the subject of mathematical physics". During his career, Dirac made numerous important contributions to mathematical subjects, including the Dirac delta function, Dirac algebra and the Dirac operator.

=== Quantum theory ===
Dirac's first step into a new quantum theory was taken late in September 1925. Ralph Fowler, his research supervisor, had received a proof copy of an exploratory paper by Werner Heisenberg in the framework of the old quantum theory of Bohr and Sommerfeld. Heisenberg leaned heavily on Bohr's correspondence principle but changed the equations so that they involved directly observable quantities, leading to the matrix formulation of quantum mechanics. Fowler sent Heisenberg's paper on to Dirac, who was on vacation in Bristol, asking him to look into this paper carefully.

Dirac's attention was drawn to a mysterious mathematical relationship, at first sight unintelligible, that Heisenberg had established. Several weeks later, back in Cambridge, Dirac suddenly recognised that this mathematical form had the same structure as the Poisson brackets that occur in the classical dynamics of particle motion. At the time, his memory of Poisson brackets was rather vague, but he found E. T. Whittaker's Analytical Dynamics of Particles and Rigid Bodies illuminating. From his new understanding, he developed a quantum theory based on non-commuting dynamical variables. This led him to the most profound and significant general formulation of quantum mechanics to date. His novel formulation using Dirac brackets allowed him to obtain the quantisation rules in a novel and more illuminating manner. For this work, published in 1926, Dirac received a PhD from Cambridge.

Dirac's book The Principles of Quantum Mechanics, first published in 1930, quickly became one of the standard textbooks on the subject and is still used today. Dirac incorporated the previous work of Heisenberg on matrix mechanics and of Erwin Schrödinger on wave mechanics into a single mathematical formalism that associates measurable quantities to operators acting on the Hilbert space of vectors that describe the state of a physical system. The book also introduced the Dirac delta function. Following his 1939 article, he included the bra–ket notation in the third edition of his book, contributing to its universal use nowadays.

=== Fermi–Dirac statistics ===
Shortly after Wolfgang Pauli proposed his Pauli exclusion principle (that two electrons cannot occupy the same quantum energy level), Enrico Fermi and Dirac both realized the principle would dramatically alter the statistical mechanics of electron systems. This work became the basis for Fermi–Dirac statistics. This applies to systems consisting of many identical spin-1/2 particles, or fermions (i.e. that obey the Pauli exclusion principle), e.g. electrons in solids and liquids, and importantly to the field of conduction in semiconductors.

=== Dirac equation ===
In 1928, building on 2×2 spin matrices which he discovered independently of Wolfgang Pauli, he proposed the Dirac equation as a relativistic equation of motion for the wave function of the electron. This led Dirac to predict the existence of the positron, the electron's antiparticle, which he interpreted in terms of what came to be called the Dirac sea. The positron was observed by Carl Anderson in 1932. Dirac's equation also contributed to explaining the origin of quantum spin as a relativistic phenomenon.

The necessity of fermions (matter) being created and destroyed in Enrico Fermi's 1934 theory of beta decay led to a reinterpretation of Dirac's equation as a "classical" field equation for any point particle of spin ħ/2, itself subject to quantisation conditions involving anti-commutators. Thus reinterpreted, in 1934 by Werner Heisenberg, as a (quantum) field equation accurately describing all elementary matter particles – today quarks and leptons – this Dirac field equation is central to theoretical physics.

=== Quantum electrodynamics ===
Dirac is regarded as the founder of quantum electrodynamics, being the first to use that term. He also introduced the idea of vacuum polarisation in the early 1930s. This work was key to the development of quantum mechanics by the next generation of theorists, in particular Julian Schwinger, Richard Feynman, Sin-Itiro Tomonaga and Freeman Dyson in their formulation of quantum electrodynamics.

In 1927, in The Quantum Theory of the Emission and Absorption of Radiation, Dirac developed a quantum treatment of radiation in which the number of light quanta could change through emission and absorption, and derived Einstein’s coefficients for the emission and absorption of radiation.

Dirac's quantum electrodynamics (QED) included terms with infinite self-energy. A workaround known as renormalisation was developed, but Dirac never accepted this. "I must say that I am very dissatisfied with the situation", he said in 1975, "because this so-called 'good theory' does involve neglecting infinities which appear in its equations, neglecting them in an arbitrary way. This is just not sensible mathematics. Sensible mathematics involves neglecting a quantity when it is small – not neglecting it just because it is infinitely great and you do not want it!" His refusal to accept renormalisation resulted in his work on the subject moving increasingly out of the mainstream. Shin'ichirō Tomonaga, Schwinger and Feynman mastered this approach, producing a QED with unprecedented accuracy, resulting in formal recognition by being awarded the 1965 Nobel Prize in Physics.

In the 1950s Paul Dirac developed a Hamiltonian theory of constraints based on lectures that he delivered at the 1949 International Mathematical Congress in Canada. Together with similar work by Peter Gabriel Bergmann, these ideas eventually developed into gauge theory.

=== Magnetic monopoles ===
In 1931, Dirac proposed that the existence of a single magnetic monopole in the universe would suffice to explain the quantisation of electrical charge. No such monopole has been detected, despite numerous attempts and preliminary claims. (See also: Searches for magnetic monopoles.)

=== Gas centrifuge ===
Dirac contributed to the Tube Alloys project, the British programme to research and construct atomic bombs during World War II. Dirac made fundamental contributions to the process of uranium enrichment and the gas centrifuge. This work was deemed to be "probably the most important theoretical result in centrifuge technology".

=== Gravity ===
Dirac quantised the gravitational field. His work laid the foundations for canonical quantum gravity. In his 1959 lecture at the Lindau Meetings, Dirac discussed why gravitational waves have "physical significance". Dirac predicted gravitational waves would have well defined energy density in 1964. Dirac reintroduced the term "graviton" in a number of lectures in 1959, noting that the energy of the gravitational field should come in quanta.

=== Cosmology ===
Dirac contributed to cosmology, putting forth his large numbers hypothesis.

=== String theory ===
Dirac is seen as having anticipated string theory, with his work on the Dirac membrane and Dirac–Born–Infeld action, both of which he proposed in a 1962 paper, along with other contributions. He also developed a general theory of the quantum field with dynamical constraints, which forms the basis of the gauge theories and superstring theories of today.

=== Hamiltonian of constrained systems ===
The Hamiltonian of constrained systems is one of Dirac's many masterpieces. It is a powerful generalisation of Hamiltonian theory that remains valid for curved spacetime. The equations for the Hamiltonian involve only six degrees of freedom described by $g_{rs}$,$p^{rs}$ for each point of the surface on which the state is considered. The $g_{m0}$ (m = 0, 1, 2, 3) appear in the theory only through the variables $g^{r0}$, $( -{g^{00}} ) ^{-1/2}$ which occur as arbitrary coefficients in the equations of motion. There are four constraints or weak equations for each point of the surface $x^0$ = constant. Three of them $H_r$ form the four vector density in the surface. The fourth $H_L$ is a 3-dimensional scalar density in the surface H_{L} ≈ 0; H_{r} ≈ 0 (r = 1, 2, 3).

In the late 1950s, Dirac applied the Hamiltonian methods he had developed to cast Einstein's general relativity in Hamiltonian form and to bring to a technical completion the quantisation problem of gravitation and bring it also closer to the rest of physics according to Salam and DeWitt. In 1959 he also gave an invited talk on "Energy of the Gravitational Field" at the New York Meeting of the American Physical Society. In 1964 he published his Lectures on Quantum Mechanics (London: Academic) which deals with constrained dynamics of nonlinear dynamical systems including quantisation of curved spacetime. He also published a paper entitled "Quantization of the Gravitational Field" in the 1967 ICTP/IAEA Trieste Symposium on Contemporary Physics.

The 1963–1964 lectures Dirac gave on quantum field theory at Yeshiva University were published in 1966 as the Belfer Graduate School of Science, Monograph Series Number, 3.

=== Philosophy of physics ===
While visiting Moscow State University in 1956, Dirac was asked to summarize his philosophy of physics. He wrote on the blackboard "Physical law should have mathematical beauty." As is traditional with inscriptions left by distinguished visitors, the phrase has never been erased.

Dirac repeatedly emphasized the role of mathematical beauty in physics. For Dirac, mathematical beauty was both a quality of nature and a useful methodological guide for the physicist. When trying to mathematically formulate a law of nature, he thought that physicists should aim for beauty. When evaluating whether a theory should be accepted, he thought that mathematical beauty could and did play a role. For example, in a 1939 lecture, he argued that the mathematically beautiful statement of the general theory of relativity was one of the reasons it was accepted.

Dirac did not express views on issues of interpretation in quantum theory. He wrote: "The interpretation of quantum mechanics has been dealt with by many authors, and I do not want to discuss it here. I want to deal with more fundamental things."

=== Other work ===
Dirac wrote an influential paper in 1933 regarding the Lagrangian in quantum mechanics. (Note: Dirac's paper "THE LAGRANGIAN IN QUANTUM MECHANICS" is reprinted in Feynman & Brown 2005) The paper served as the basis for Julian Schwinger and his quantum action principle, and laid the foundations for Richard Feynman's development of a completely new approach to quantum mechanics, the path integral formulation.

In a 1963 paper, Dirac initiated the study of field theory on anti-de Sitter space (AdS). The paper contains the mathematics of combining special relativity with the quantum mechanics of quarks inside hadrons, and lays the foundations of two-mode squeezed states that are essential to modern quantum optics, though Dirac did not realize it at the time. Dirac previously worked on AdS during the 1930s, publishing a paper in 1935.

In 1930, Victor Weisskopf and Eugene Wigner published their famous and now standard calculation of spontaneous radiation emission in atomic and molecular physics. Remarkably, in a letter to Niels Bohr in February 1927, Dirac had come to the same calculation, but he did not publish it.

In 1938, Dirac renormalized the mass in the theory of Abraham-Lorentz electron, leading to the Abraham–Lorentz–Dirac force, which is the relativistic-classical electron model; however, this model has solutions that suggest force increase exponentially with time.

Fermi's golden rule, the formula for computing quantum transitions in time dependent systems, declared a "golden rule" by Enrico Fermi, was derived by Dirac. Dirac was the one to initiate the development of time-dependent perturbation theory in his early work on semi-classical atoms interacting with an electromagnetic field. Dirac, with Werner Heisenberg, John Archibald Wheeler, Richard Feynman, and Freeman Dyson ultimately developed this concept into an invaluable tool for modern physics, used in the calculation of the properties of any physical system and a wide array of phenomena.

== Recognition ==
=== Memberships ===
Year	Organisation	Type	Ref.
1930	(United Kingdom) Royal Society	Fellow	
1938	(United States) American Philosophical Society	International Member	
1949	(United States) National Academy of Sciences	International Member	
1950	(United States) American Academy of Arts and Sciences	International Honorary Member	
1961	(Vatican City) Pontifical Academy of Sciences	Member	

=== Awards ===
Year	Organisation	Award	Citation	Ref.
1933	(Sweden) Royal Swedish Academy of Sciences	Nobel Prize in Physics (Note: Shared with Erwin Schrödinger)	"For the discovery of new productive forms of atomic theory."	
1939	(United Kingdom) Royal Society	Royal Medal	"For the leading part he had taken in the development of the new quantum mechanics."	
1952	(United Kingdom) Royal Society	Copley Medal	"In recognition of his remarkable contributions to relativistic dynamics of a particle in quantum mechanics."	
1952	(West Germany) German Physical Society	Max Planck Medal	—	
1969	(United States) University of Miami	J. Robert Oppenheimer Memorial Prize	—	

== Commemoration ==
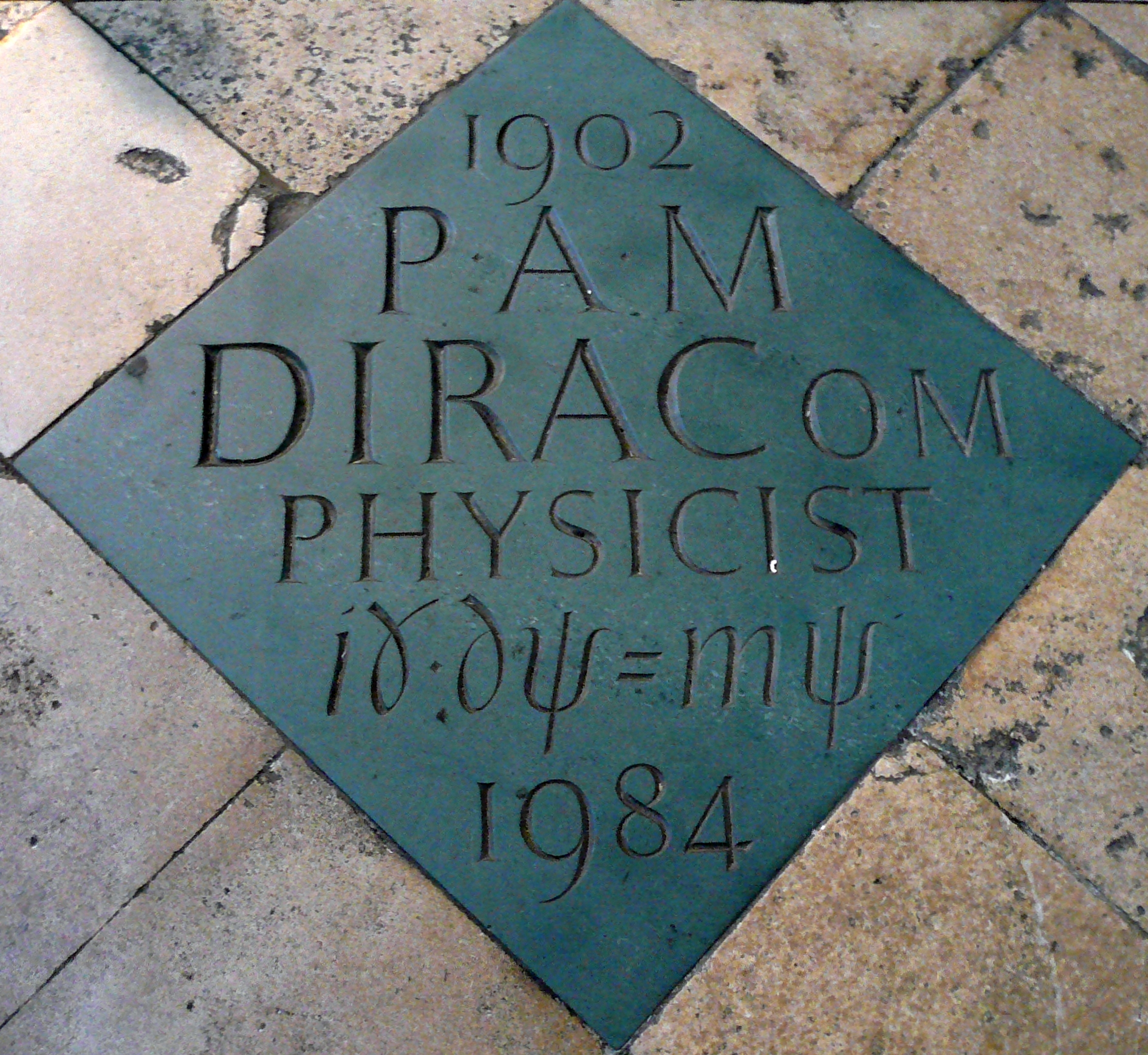
The commemorative marker in Westminster Abbey

Dirac's childhood home in Bishopston, Bristol, is commemorated with a blue plaque, and the nearby Dirac Road is named in recognition of his links with the city of Bristol. A commemorative stone was erected in a garden in Saint-Maurice, Switzerland, the town of origin of his father's family, on 1 August 1991. On 13 November 1995 a commemorative marker, made from Burlington green slate and inscribed with the Dirac equation, was unveiled in Westminster Abbey. The Dean of Westminster, Edward Carpenter, had initially refused permission for the memorial, thinking Dirac to be anti-Christian, but was eventually (over a five-year period) persuaded to relent.

After his death, two organisations of professional physicists established annual awards in Dirac's memory. The Institute of Physics, the United Kingdom's professional body for physicists, awards the Paul Dirac Medal for "outstanding contributions to theoretical (including mathematical and computational) physics". The first three recipients were Stephen Hawking (1987), John Stewart Bell (1988), and Roger Penrose (1989). Since 1985, the International Centre for Theoretical Physics awards the Dirac Medal of the ICTP each year on Dirac's birthday (8 August).

The Dirac–Hellman Award at Florida State University was endowed by Bruce P. Hellman in 1997 to reward outstanding work in theoretical physics by FSU researchers. The Paul A.M. Dirac Science Library at Florida State University, which Margit Dirac opened in December 1989, is named in his honour, and his papers are held there. Outside is a statue of him by Gabriella Bollobás. The street on which the National High Magnetic Field Laboratory in Innovation Park of Tallahassee, Florida, is located is named Paul Dirac Drive. As well as in his hometown of Bristol, there is also a road named after him, Dirac Place, in Didcot, Oxfordshire. The Dirac-Higgs Science Centre in Bristol is also named in his honour.

The BBC named a video codec, Dirac, in his honour. An asteroid discovered in 1983 was named after Dirac. The Distributed Research utilising Advanced Computing (DiRAC) and Dirac software are named in his honour.

=== Praise ===
Dirac is widely considered to be on par with Isaac Newton, James Clerk Maxwell, and Albert Einstein. Einstein wrote that to Dirac "we owe the most logically perfect presentation of [quantum mechanics]."

On the occasion of the 100th anniversary of Dirac's birth, Richard Dalitz wrote "The influence and importance of Dirac's work have increased with the decades, and physicists use daily the concepts and equations that he developed."

In Lev Landau's logarithmic scale of physicists from 0 to 5 based on productivity and genius, (0 being the highest and 5 the lowest) he ranked Dirac a 1, along with other fathers of quantum mechanics such as Schrödinger and Werner Heisenberg.

John Polkinghorne wrote: "Not only was Dirac the greatest theoretical physicist known to me personally, his purity of spirt and modesty of demeanour (he never emphasized in the slightest degree his own immense contributions to the fundamentals of the subject) made him an inspiring figure and a kind of scientific saint."

== Books ==
- The Principles of Quantum Mechanics (1930): This book summarises the ideas of quantum mechanics using the modern formalism that was largely developed by Dirac himself. Towards the end of the book, he also discusses the relativistic theory of the electron (the Dirac equation), which was also pioneered by him. This work does not refer to any other writings then available on quantum mechanics.
- Lectures on Quantum Mechanics. Yeshiva University Belfer Graduate School of Science Monographs. 1964. ISBN 0-486-41713-1. Much of this book deals with quantum mechanics in curved space-time.
- Lectures on Quantum Field Theory (1966): This book lays down the foundations of quantum field theory using the Hamiltonian formalism.
- Spinors in Hilbert Space (1974): This book based on lectures given in 1969 at the University of Miami deals with the basic aspects of spinors starting with a real Hilbert space formalism.
- General Theory of Relativity (1975): Based on Dirac's 1975 lectures at Florida State University, this 69-page work summarises Einstein's general theory of relativity.
