= J. Robert Oppenheimer Memorial Prize =

Center for Theoretical Studies, University of Miami,

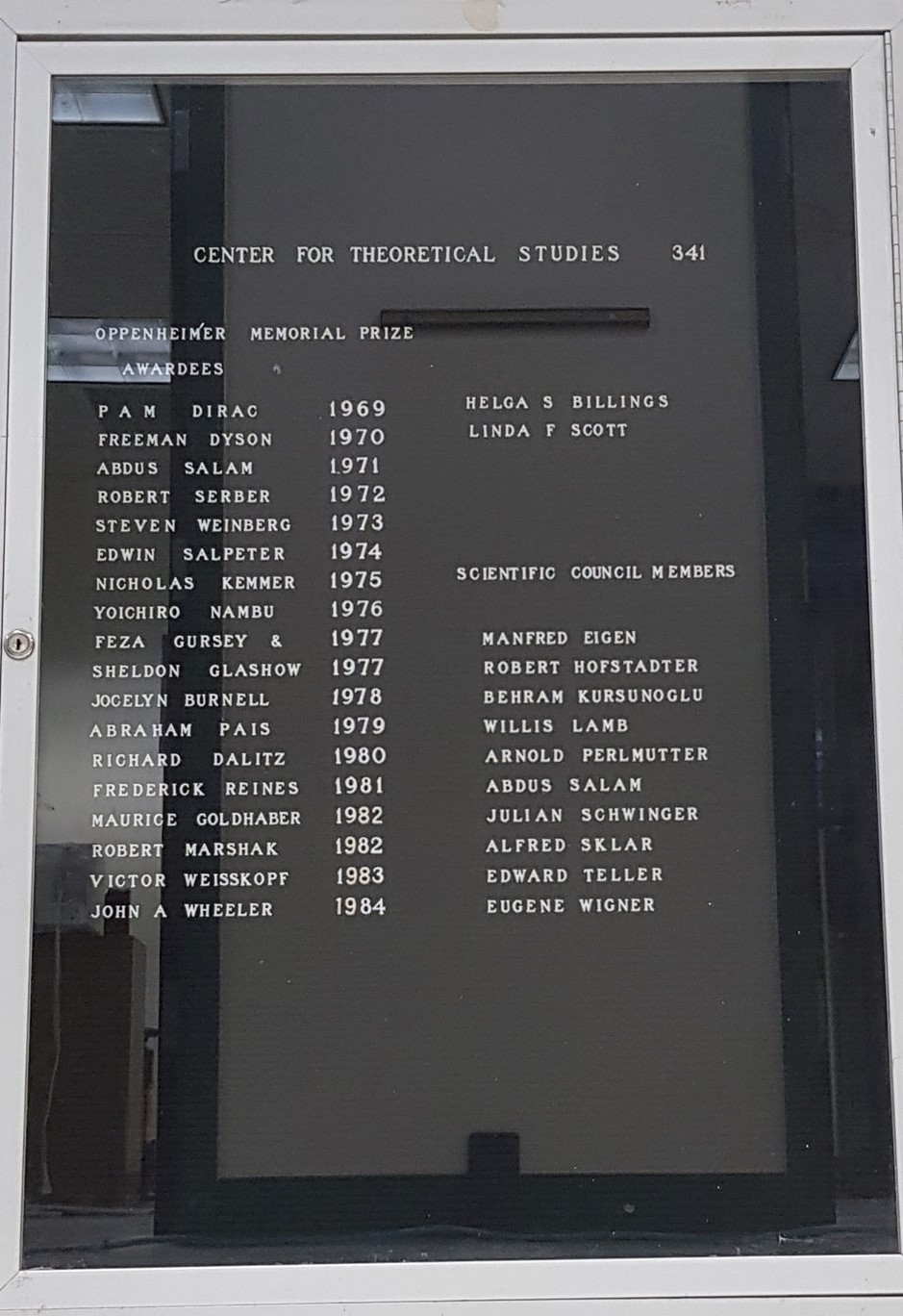
List of Recipients, Department of Physics, University of Miami

The J. Robert Oppenheimer Memorial Prize and Medal was awarded by the Center for Theoretical Studies, University of Miami, from 1969, until 1984. Established in memory of US physicist J. Robert Oppenheimer, the award consisted of a medal, certificate and a $1000 honorarium. It was awarded for "outstanding contributions to the theoretical natural sciences [...] during the preceding decade". The acceptance speech for the inaugural award to Dirac was published as The Development of Quantum Theory (1971).

== Recipients ==
- 1969 – Paul Dirac
- 1970 – Freeman Dyson
- 1971 – Abdus Salam
- 1972 – Robert Serber
- 1973 – Steven Weinberg
- 1974 – Edwin Ernest Salpeter
- 1975 – Nicholas Kemmer
- 1976 – Yoichiro Nambu
- 1977 – Feza Gursey and Sheldon Glashow
- 1978 – Jocelyn Bell Burnell
- 1979 – Abraham Pais
- 1980 – Richard H. Dalitz
- 1981 – Frederick Reines
- 1982 – Maurice Goldhaber and Robert E. Marshak
- 1983 – Victor F. Weisskopf
- 1984 – John Archibald Wheeler

== See also ==
- List of physics awards

== Sources ==
- Walter, Claire (1982). Winners, the blue ribbon encyclopedia of awards. Facts on File Inc. ISBN 9780871963864.
