= Jocelyn Bell Burnell =

Northern Irish physicist (born 1943)

Dame Jocelyn Bell Burnell CH DBE FRS FRSE FRAS FInstP HonMRIA HonFLSW
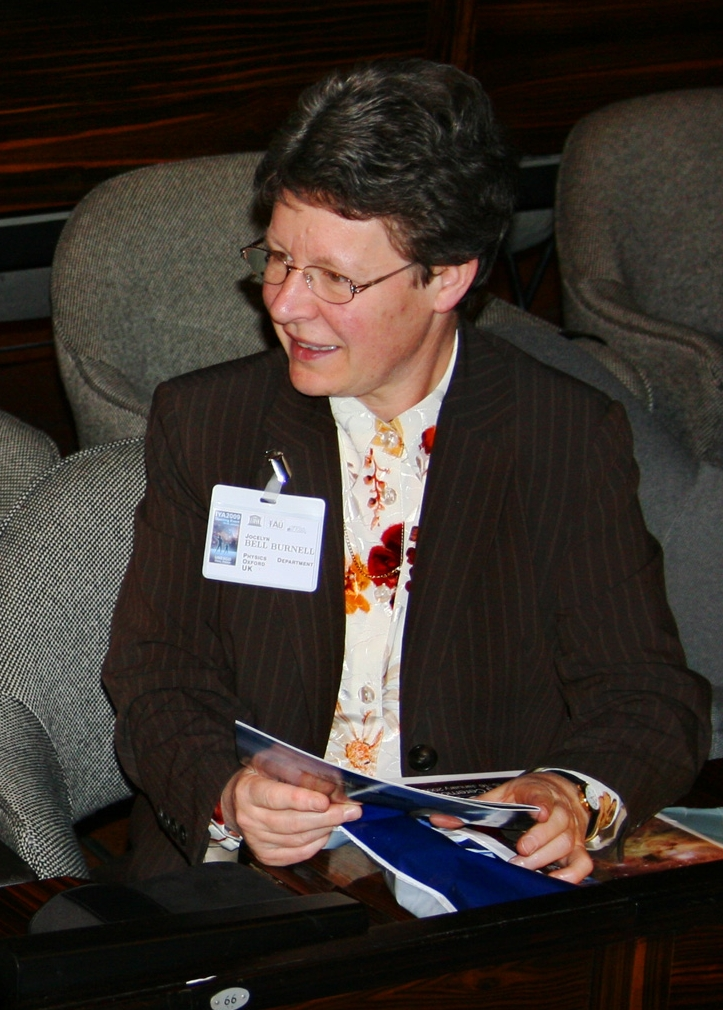
- Bell Burnell in 2009

83rd President of the Royal Astronomical Society
- In office 2002–2004
- Preceded by: Nigel Weiss
- Succeeded by: Kathryn Whaler

Personal details
- Born: Susan Jocelyn Bell; 15 July 1943 (age 83) Lurgan, County Armagh, Northern Ireland
- Education: Lurgan College; The Mount School, York
- Scientific career
- Education: University of Glasgow (BSc, 1965); University of Cambridge (PhD, 1969)
- Known for: Discovering pulsars (1967)
- Spouse: Martin Burnell (m. 1968; div. 1993)
- Children: 1
- Awards: J. Robert Oppenheimer Memorial Prize (1978); Beatrice M. Tinsley Prize (1986); Herschel Medal (1989); Michael Faraday Prize (2010); Royal Medal (2015); Grande Médaille (2018); Breakthrough Prize in Fundamental Physics (2018); Copley Medal (2021); Gold Medal of the Royal Astronomical Society (2021); Prix Jules Janssen (2022); Cunningham Medal (2023)
- Honours: Order of the British Empire (Commander, 1999; Dame Commander, 2007), Order of the Companions of Honour (2025)
- Fields: Physics; Astrophysics
- Workplaces: University of Southampton (1968–1973); Open University (1973–1987, 1991–2001); University College London (1974–1982); Royal Observatory, Edinburgh (1982–1991); University of Bath (2001–2004)
- Thesis: The Measurement of radio source diameters using a diffraction method (1968)
- Doctoral advisor: Antony Hewish
- Dame Jocelyn Bell Burnell's voice from the BBC programme The Life Scientific, 19 December 2018.
- Website: www2.physics.ox.ac.uk/contacts/people/bellburnell

Dame Susan Jocelyn Bell Burnell (/bɜːrˈnɛl/; née Bell; born 15 July 1943) is a Northern Irish astrophysicist and radio astronomer who, while conducting research for her doctorate in 1967, discovered the first known pulsar. This discovery was recognized by the Nobel Prize in Physics in 1974, though she was not among its recipients.

Bell Burnell was president of the Royal Astronomical Society from 2002 to 2004, president of the Institute of Physics from October 2008 until October 2010, and interim president of the Institute following the death of her successor, Marshall Stoneham, in early 2011. She was Chancellor of the University of Dundee from 2018 to 2023.

In 2018, she was awarded the Special Breakthrough Prize in Fundamental Physics. Following the announcement of the award, she decided to use the $3 million (£2.3 million) prize money to establish a fund to help female, minority and refugee students to become research physicists. The fund is administered by the Institute of Physics.

In 2021, Bell Burnell became the second female recipient (after Dorothy Hodgkin in 1976) of the Copley Medal. In 2025, Bell Burnell's image was included on an An Post stamp celebrating women in STEM.

== Early life and education ==
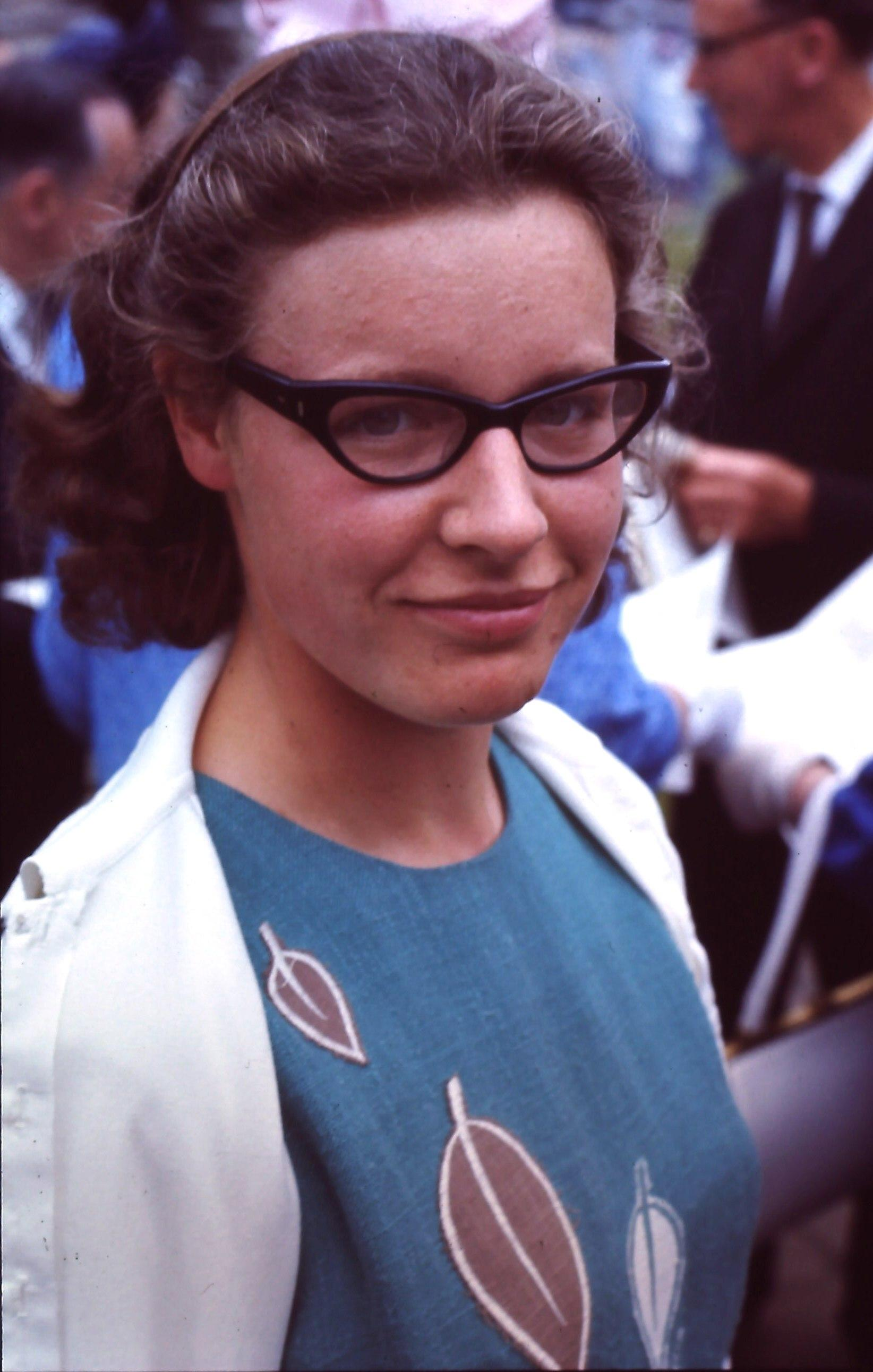
Jocelyn Bell Burnell, June 1967

Bell Burnell was born in Lurgan, County Armagh, Northern Ireland, to M. Allison and G. Philip Bell. Their country home was called "Solitude" and she grew up there with her younger brother and two younger sisters. She enjoyed her father's books on astronomy, and visited the nearby Armagh Observatory, where the staff encouraged her to pursue a career in astronomy. Her father, an architect, later helped design the Armagh Planetarium.

She grew up in Lurgan and attended the Preparatory Department (Note: The Preparatory Department of Lurgan College closed in 2004, the college becoming a selective grammar school for ages 14–19.) of Lurgan College from 1948 to 1956. At the time, boys could study technical subjects, but girls were expected to study domestic subjects such as cooking and cross-stitching. Bell Burnell was able to study science only after her parents and others challenged the school's policies.

She failed the eleven-plus exam and her parents sent her to The Mount School, a Quaker girls' boarding school in York, England, where she completed her secondary education in 1961. There she was favourably impressed by her physics teacher, Mr. Tillott, and stated:

You do not have to learn lots and lots ... of facts; you just learn a few key things, and ... then you can apply and build and develop from those ... He was a really good teacher and showed me, actually, how easy physics was.

She next joined the University of Glasgow, where in 1965 she graduated with a Bachelor of Science degree in Natural Philosophy (physics), with honours, and then New Hall, Cambridge, where she gained a PhD in 1969.

At Cambridge, she worked with Antony Hewish and others to construct (Note: "... upon entering the faculty, each student was issued a set of tools: a pair of pliers, a pair of long-nose pliers, a wire cutter, and a screwdriver...", said during a public lecture in Montreal during the 40 Years of Pulsars conference, 14 August 2007) the Interplanetary Scintillation Array just outside Cambridge to study quasars, which had recently been discovered. (Note: Interplanetary scintillation allows compact sources to be distinguished from extended ones.)

== Career and research ==
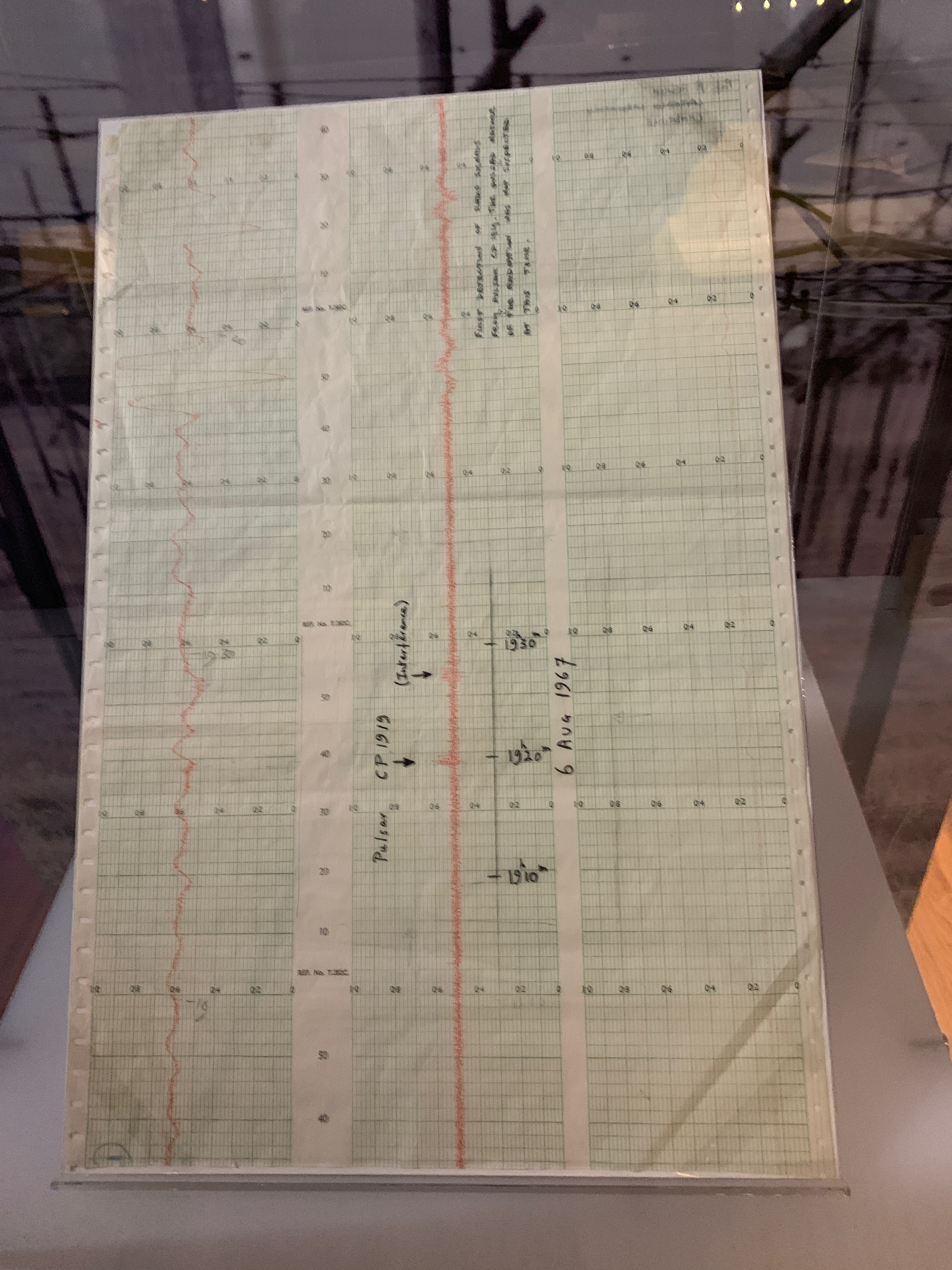
Chart on which Bell Burnell first recognised evidence of a pulsar, exhibited at Cambridge University Library

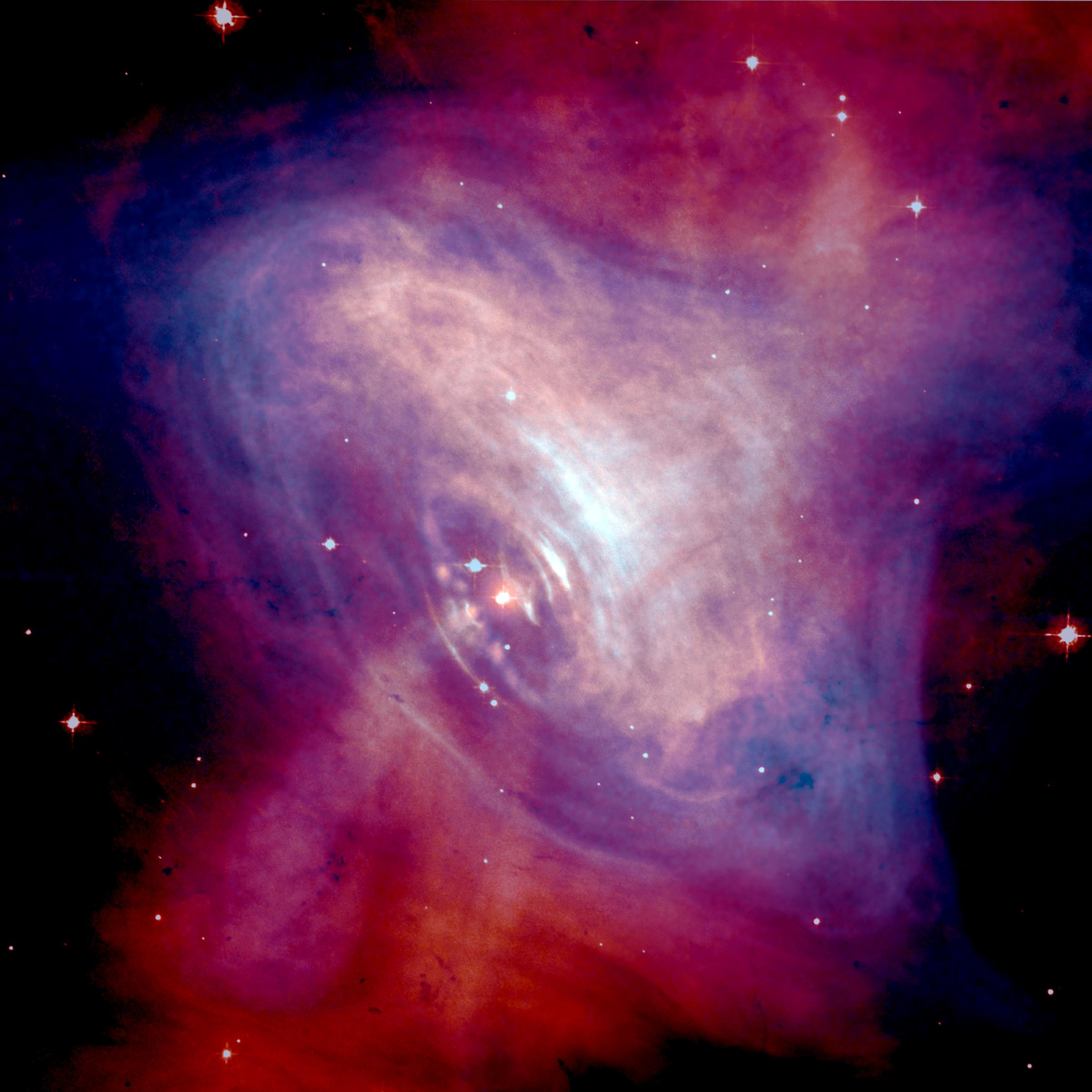
Composite Optical/X-ray image of the Crab Nebula, showing synchrotron emission in the surrounding pulsar wind nebula, powered by injection of magnetic fields and particles from the central pulsar

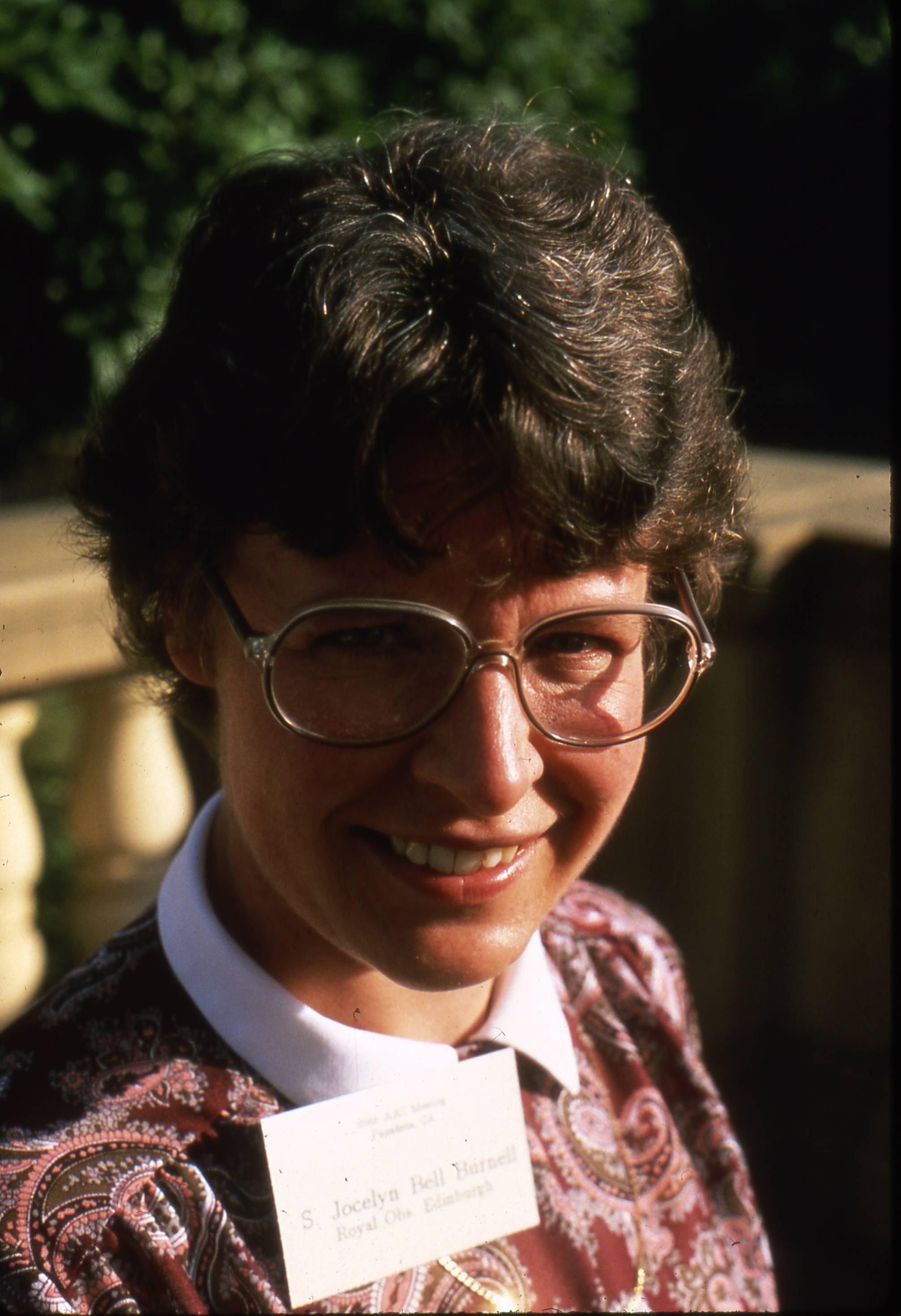
Bell Burnell attends the American Astronomical Society (AAS) meeting at Pasadena, California, 5 January 1987

On 28 November 1967, while a postgraduate student at Cambridge, Bell Burnell detected a "bit of scruff" on her chart-recorder papers that tracked across the sky with the stars. The signal had been visible in data taken in August, but as the papers had to be checked by hand, it took her three months to find it. She established that the signal was pulsing with great regularity, at a rate of about one pulse every one and a third seconds. Temporarily dubbed "Little Green Man 1" (LGM-1) the source (now known as PSR B1919+21) was identified after several years as a rapidly rotating neutron star. This was later documented by the BBC Horizon series.

She worked at the University of Southampton between 1968 and 1973, University College London from 1974 to 1982 and the Royal Observatory, Edinburgh (1982–1991). From 1973 to 1987 she was a tutor, consultant, examiner, and lecturer for the Open University. In 1986, she became the project manager for the James Clerk Maxwell Telescope on Mauna Kea, Hawaii, a position she held until 1991. She was Professor of Physics at the Open University from 1991 to 2001. She was also a visiting professor at Princeton University in the United States and dean of science at the University of Bath (2001–2004), and President of the Royal Astronomical Society between 2002 and 2004.

Bell Burnell was visiting professor of astrophysics at the University of Oxford, and a Fellow of Mansfield College in 2007. She was President of the Institute of Physics between 2008 and 2010. In 2013, Bell Burnell was elected Pro-Chancellor of Trinity College, Dublin. In February 2018 she was appointed Chancellor of the University of Dundee. In 2018, Bell Burnell visited Parkes, NSW, to deliver the keynote John Bolton lecture at the Central West Astronomical Society (CWAS) AstroFest event.

In 2006, Bell Burnell chaired the 26th General Assembly of the International Astronomical Union, where it was decided that:

(1) A "planet" [1] is a celestial body that (a) is in orbit around the Sun, (b) has sufficient mass for its self-gravity to overcome rigid body forces so that it assumes a hydrostatic equilibrium (nearly round) shape, and (c) has cleared the neighbourhood around its orbit.

(2) A "dwarf planet" is a celestial body that (a) is in orbit around the Sun, (b) has sufficient mass for its self-gravity to overcome rigid body forces so that it assumes a hydrostatic equilibrium (nearly round) shape [2], (c) has not cleared the neighbourhood around its orbit, and

(d) is not a satellite.

(3) All other objects [3], except satellites, orbiting the Sun shall be referred to collectively as "Small Solar-System Bodies".

This led to the conclusion that Pluto would be demoted to its current status as a dwarf planet. She has spoken frequently about this decision and the public outcry which followed.

In a 2020 lecture at Harvard, she related how the media was covering the discovery of pulsars, with interviews taking a standard "disgusting" format: Hewish would be asked on the astrophysics, and she would be the "human interest" part, asked about vital statistics, how many boyfriends she had, what colour is her hair, and asked to undo some buttons for the photographs. The Daily Telegraph science reporter shortened "pulsating radio source" to pulsar.

=== Nobel Prize controversy ===
Controversially, Bell did not receive recognition in the 1974 Nobel Prize in Physics. She helped build the Interplanetary Scintillation Array over two years and initially noticed the anomaly, sometimes reviewing as much as 96 feet (29 m) of paper data per night. Bell later said that she had to be persistent in reporting the anomaly in the face of scepticism from Hewish, who initially insisted it was due to interference and man-made. She spoke of meetings held by Hewish and Ryle to which she was not invited.

The paper announcing the discovery of pulsars had five authors. Bell's thesis supervisor Antony Hewish was listed first, Bell second. Hewish was awarded the Nobel Prize, along with the astronomer Martin Ryle. At the time fellow astronomer Sir Fred Hoyle criticised Bell's omission. In 1977, Bell Burnell commented:

I believe it would demean Nobel Prizes if they were awarded to research students, except in very exceptional cases, and I do not believe this is one of them.

The Royal Swedish Academy of Sciences, in its press release announcing the prize, cited Ryle and Hewish for their pioneering work in radio-astrophysics, with particular mention of Ryle's work on aperture-synthesis technique and Hewish's decisive role in the discovery of pulsars.

Feryal Özel, an astrophysicist at the University of Arizona, characterized Bell Burnell's contributions as follows:

She helped build the array she used to make the observation. She is the one who noticed it. She is the one who argued it's a real signal. When a graduate student takes that kind of lead in her project, it's hard to play it down.

In later years, she opined that "the fact that I was a graduate student and a woman, together, demoted my standing in terms of receiving a Nobel prize." The decision continues to be debated to this day.

== Awards and honours ==
=== Awards ===
- The Albert A. Michelson Medal of the Franklin Institute of Philadelphia (1973, jointly with Dr. Hewish).
- J. Robert Oppenheimer Memorial Prize from the Center for Theoretical Studies, University of Miami (1978).
- Beatrice M. Tinsley Prize of the American Astronomical Society (1986).
- Herschel Medal of the Royal Astronomical Society (1989).
- Jansky Lectureship before the National Radio Astronomy Observatory (1995).
- Magellanic Premium of the American Philosophical Society (2000).
- Elected a Fellow of the Royal Society (FRS) (March 2003).
- Elected a Fellow of the Royal Society of Edinburgh (FRSE) (2004).
- William E. Gordon and Elva Gordon distinguished lecture at the Arecibo Observatory on 27 June 2006.
- The Grote Reber Medal at the General Assembly of the International Union of Radio Science (URSI) in Istanbul (19 August 2011)
- Lise-Meitner-Lecture at the Technical University Vienna (2013)
- The Royal Medal of the Royal Society (2015).
- The Women of the Year Prudential Lifetime Achievement Award (2015)
- The Institute of Physics President's Medal (2017)
- Grande Médaille of the French Academy of Sciences (2018)
- Special Breakthrough Prize in Fundamental Physics (2018). She donated the three million dollars of the Breakthrough Prize to the Bell Burnell Scholarship Fund to promote greater diversity in physics.
- 23rd Annual Katzenstein Distinguished Lecture at the University of Connecticut (2019)
- Gold Medal of the Royal Astronomical Society (2021)
- The Royal Society's Copley Medal (2021)
- The Astronomische Gesellschaft's Karl Schwarzschild Medal (2021)
- The Prix Jules Janssen of the Société astronomique de France (2022)
- The Dalton medal of the Manchester Literary and Philosophical Society (2026)

=== Honours ===
Jocelyn Bell Burnell in Manchester, 2026

- In 1999, she was appointed Commander of the Order of the British Empire (CBE) for services to Astronomy and promoted to Dame Commander of the Order of the British Empire (DBE) in 2007.
- In 2012, she was elected an Honorary Member of the Royal Irish Academy (HonMRIA).
- In February 2013, she was assessed as one of the 100 most powerful women in the United Kingdom by Woman's Hour on BBC Radio 4.
- She was recognized as one of the BBC's 100 women of 2014.
- In February 2014, she was elected President of the Royal Society of Edinburgh, the first woman to hold that office. She held the position from April 2014 to April 2018 when she was succeeded by Dame Anne Glover.
- In 2016, the Institute of Physics renamed their award for early-career female physicists the Jocelyn Bell Burnell Medal and Prize.
- In 2016, she was elected an International member of the American Philosophical Society.
- In 2019, she was awarded an Honorary Doctorate of Laws from the University of Bath.
- In 2020, she was elected a Legacy Fellow of the American Astronomical Society.
- In 2020, she was elected an Honorary Fellow of the Learned Society of Wales.
- A painting of her by Stephen Shankand, commissioned by the Royal Society, was added to the collection in the Society's Carlton House Terrace headquarters in November 2020.
- In 2020, she was included by the BBC in a list of seven important but little-known British female scientists.
- In 2020, she was made an Honorary Fellow of Trinity College Dublin.
- In 2022, she received the Matteucci Medal by the Accademia nazionale delle scienze, Italy.
- In 2023, she was awarded the Royal Irish Academy's Cunningham Medal and the 2022 Prix Jules Janssen from the Société astronomique de France.
- In 2024, she was awarded the Hawking Fellowship by the Cambridge Union in the University of Cambridge.
- In the 2025 Birthday Honours, she was appointed to the Order of the Companions of Honour.
- In 2026, she was awarded the Dalton Medal by Manchester Literary and Philosophical Society.

In 2018, she was awarded the Special Breakthrough Prize in Fundamental Physics, worth three million dollars (£2.3 million), for her discovery of radio pulsars. The Special Prize, in contrast to the regular annual prize, is not restricted to recent discoveries. She donated all of the money "to fund women, under-represented ethnic minority and refugee students to become physics researchers", the funds to be administered by the Institute of Physics.

Bell Burnell was the subject of the first part of the BBC Four three-part series Beautiful Minds, directed by Jacqui Farnham.

Issued in July 2022, Ulster Bank's new science-themed polymer £50 banknote prominently features Bell Burnell alongside other women, including those working in NI's life sciences industry. She said, "I'm passionate about encouraging more women to pursue scientific careers and I think it's something that is very important for Northern Ireland. There is a burgeoning scientific sector here. More women pursuing careers in science will support that ongoing growth."

=== Species named in her honour ===
A new nudibranch species Cadlina bellburnellae was named in honour of Jocelyn Bell Burnell

== Publications ==
Her publications (Note: Jocelyn Bell Burnell publications indexed by the Scopus bibliographic database. (subscription required)) include:

- Burnell, S. Jocelyn (1989). Broken for Life. Swarthmore Lecture. London: Quaker Home Service. ISBN 978-0-85245-222-6.
- Riordan, Maurice; Burnell, S. Jocelyn (27 October 2008). Dark Matter: Poems of Space. Calouste Gulbenkian Foundation. ISBN 978-1-903080-10-8.

== Personal and non-academic life ==
Bell Burnell is house patron of Burnell House at Cambridge House Grammar School in Ballymena, County Antrim. She has campaigned to improve the status and number of women in professional and academic posts in the fields of physics and astronomy.

=== Quaker activities and beliefs ===
From her school days, she has been an active Quaker and served as Clerk to the sessions of Britain Yearly Meeting in 1995, 1996 and 1997. Bell Burnell also served as Clerk of the Central Executive Committee of Friends World Committee for Consultation from 2008 to 2012. She delivered a Swarthmore Lecture under the title Broken for Life, at Yearly Meeting in Aberdeen on 1 August 1989, and was the plenary speaker at the US Friends General Conference Gathering in 2000. She spoke of her personal religious history and beliefs in an interview with Joan Bakewell in 2006.

Bell Burnell served on the Quaker Peace and Social Witness Testimonies Committee, which produced Engaging with the Quaker Testimonies: a Toolkit in February 2007. In 2013, she gave a James Backhouse Lecture which was published in a book entitled A Quaker Astronomer Reflects: Can a Scientist Also Be Religious?, in which Burnell reflects about how cosmological knowledge can be related to what the Bible, Quakerism or Christian faith states.

=== Marriage ===
In 1968, between the discovery of the second and third pulsar, Bell became engaged to Martin Burnell and they married soon after; the couple divorced in 1993 after separating in 1989. In a 2021 online lecture at the University of Bedfordshire, Bell Burnell reflected on her first experience returning to the observatory wearing an engagement ring. Though she was proud of her ring, she said wearing it was a mistake, as, at the time, if a married woman worked it implied her husband was incapable of providing, which was shameful.

Her husband was a local government officer, and his career took them to various parts of Britain. She worked part-time for many years while raising their son, Gavin Burnell, who is a member of the condensed matter physics group at the University of Leeds.

== See also ==
- Timeline of women in science
- Nobel Prize controversies

== Works cited ==
- "AAS Fellows". AAS. 2020.
- Addley, Esther (16 June 2007). "From Russia with gong". The Guardian.
- Allan, Vicky (5 January 2015). "Face to Face: science star who went under the radar of Nobel Prize judges". The Herald. Glasgow.
- "APS Member History". American Philosophical Society.
- Bain, Mark (8 July 2022). "Lurgan-born astrophysicist Dame Jocelyn Bell Burnell hopes science-themed £50 note will raise profile of women in the sector". Belfast Telegraph.
- Bakewell, Joan (9 November 2010). "Interview with Jocelyn Bell Burnell". Belief. BBC. Archived from the original on 9 November 2010.
- "Beatrice M. Tinsley Prize". American Astronomical Society. Archived from the original on 17 January 2013.
- "Beautiful Minds, Series 1". BBC Four. 25 April 2011.
- "Beautiful Minds, Series 1, Jocelyn Bell Burnell (Part 1 of 3)". BBC Four. 24 April 2011.
- "Bell Burnell, Dame (Susan) Jocelyn, (born 15 July 1943), astronomer; Visiting Professor of Astrophysics, University of Oxford, since 2004; President, Royal Society of Edinburgh, 2014–March 2018". Who's Who (UK). Oxford University Press. 1 December 2017. doi:10.1093/ww/9780199540884.013.7157. ISBN 978-0-19-954088-4.
- Bell Burnell, Jocelyn (26 October 1995). "The woman who discovered pulsars: An Interview with Jocelyn Bell Burnell at NRAO (National Radio Astronomy Observatory)" (Interview). Interviewed by Kate Marsh Weatherall & David G. Finley. Weatherall Technical Applications.
- Bell Burnell, Jocelyn (21 May 2000). "Oral History Interviews: Jocelyn Bell Burnell" (Interview). Interviewed by David DeVorkin. College Park, MD: AIP.
- Bell Burnell, Jocelyn (2007). "Pulsars 40 Years on". Science. 318 (5850): 579–581. doi:10.1126/science.1150039. ISSN 0036-8075. PMID 17962545. S2CID 120774849.
- Bell Burnell, Jocelyn (2013b). A Quaker Astronomer Reflects: Can a Scientist Also Be Religious?. James Backhouse Lecture. Australia Yearly Meeting of the Religious Society of Friends (Quakers). p. 11. ISBN 978-0-646-59239-8.
- Bell Burnell, Jocelyn (15 November 2013a). Pulsars and Extreme Physics. TU Wien – via YouTube.
- Bell Burnell, Jocelyn (8 November 2019). 23rd Annual Katzenstein Distinguished Lecture. University of Connecticut – via YouTube.
- Bell Burnell, Jocelyn (13 February 2020). "The Discovery Of Pulsars - A graduate student's tale" – via YouTube.
- Bell Burnell, Jocelyn (24 March 2021). Dame Jocelyn Bell Burnell delivers a fascinating lecture titled 'We Are Made of Star Stuff'. University of Bedfordshire – via YouTube.
- Bell Burnell, S.J. (2004). "So Few Pulsars, So Few Females". Science. 304 (5670): 426–489. doi:10.1126/science.304.5670.489. PMID 15105461. S2CID 43369972.
- Bell Burnell, S. Jocelyn (1977). "Petit Four – After Dinner Speech published in the Annals of the New York Academy of Science Dec 1977". Annals of the New York Academy of Sciences. 302: 685–689. Bibcode:1977NYASA.302..685B. doi:10.1111/j.1749-6632.1977.tb37085.x. S2CID 222086632.
- Bell, Susan Jocelyn (1968). The Measurement of radio source diameters using a diffraction method. repository.cam.ac.uk (PhD thesis). University of Cambridge. doi:10.17863/CAM.4926. OCLC 500382385. EThOS uk.bl.ethos.449485.
- Bertsch McGrayne, Sharon (1998). Nobel Prize women in science: their lives, struggles, and momentous discoveries (Rev. ed.). Secaucus, N.J.: Carol Pub. Group. ISBN 978-0-8065-2025-4. OCLC 39633911 – via Internet Archive.
- Brown, Mark (28 November 2020). "'It'll upset a few fellows': Royal Society adds Jocelyn Bell Burnell portrait". The Guardian.
- "Cosmic Search Vol. 1, No. 1 – Little Green Men, White Dwarfs or Pulsars?".
- "Council". Institute of Physics. Archived from the original on 9 March 2011.
- "Dame Jocelyn Bell Burnell". The Life Scientific. 25 October 2011. BBC Radio 4.
- "Dame Jocelyn Bell Burnell Appointed Chancellor of the University of Dundee". University of Dundee. 20 February 2018.
- "Dame Jocelyn Bell Burnell awarded Cunningham Medal and the Jules Janssen Prize". Royal Society of Edinburgh. 14 March 2023.
- "Dame Jocelyn Bell Burnell becomes second woman to be awarded Copley Medal". The Irish News. 23 August 2021.
- "Dame Jocelyn Bell Burnell to be Royal Society's first female president". BBC Scotland. 5 February 2014.
- "Dame Jocelyn Bell-Burnell – 2018 AstroFest Keynote Speaker". Central West Astronomical Society.
- "Dame Jocelyn Bell-Burnell: NI scientist awarded Royal Society's highest prize". BBC News. 24 August 2021.
- "The discovery of pulsars". Horizon. BBC. 1 September 2010. BBC Two.
- "Dr Gavin Burnell: Associate Professor in Condensed Matter Physics". Condensed Matter Physics Group, University of Leeds. 2010.
- Eisberg, Joann (1997). "Jocelyn Bell Burnell (1943–)". In Shearer, Benjamin F.; Shearer, Barbara (eds.). Notable Women in the Physical Sciences: A Biographical Dictionary. Westport, CT and London: Greenwood Press. pp. 9–14. ISBN 978-0-313-29303-0 – via Internet Archive.
- "The Franklin Institute Awards | the Franklin Institute Science Museum". Franklin Institute. 3 February 2014. Archived from the original on 5 February 2012.
- "Franklin Laureate Database – Albert A. Michelson Medal Laureates". Franklin Institute. Archived from the original on 6 April 2012.
- Friedberg, Arthur L. (28 March 2022). "Ulster Bank honors marginalized astrophysicist on £50 note". Coin World.
- "German Astronomical Society 2021 Awards". German Astronomical Society/Astronomische Gesellschaft. 26 August 2021. "With the highest award for astronomical research in Germany, the Astronomical Society honours Professor Bell Burnell as an eminent scientist whose work has not only created the field of pulsar astronomy - with diverse applications in a wide range of fundamental physics and astrophysics - but has had a great impact on the field of astrophysics as a whole."
- Ghosh, Pallab (6 September 2018). "Fund to counter physics 'white male bias'". BBC News.
- Ghosh, Pallab (19 March 2019). "Fund to boost female and black physicist numbers". BBC News.
- Gold, Lauren (6 July 2006). "Discoverer of pulsars (aka Little Green Men) reflects on the process of discovery and being a female pioneer". Cornell Chronicle.
- "Grote Reber Medal Winners: 2011 Winner: Professor Jocelyn Bell Burnell". QVMAG. Archived from the original on 6 January 2016.
- Hargittai, István (2003). The road to Stockholm: Nobel Prizes, science, and scientists. Oxford University Press. p. 240. Bibcode:2002rost.book.....H. ISBN 978-0-19-860785-4.
- "Hawking receives Einstein Award". Physics Today. 31 (4): 68. April 1978. Bibcode:1978PhT....31d..68.. doi:10.1063/1.2995004. "Jocelyn Bell Burnell, researcher on the staff of the Mullard Space Science Laboratory of University College London, is the recipient of the 1978 J. Robert Oppenheimer Memorial Prize."
- "Herschel Medal Winners" (PDF). Royal Astronomical Society. Archived from the original (PDF) on 24 September 2015.
- Hewish, A.; Bell, S. J.; Pilkington, J. D. H.; Scott, P. F.; Collins, R. A. (1968). "Observation of a Rapidly Pulsating Radio Source". Nature. 217 (5130): 709. Bibcode:1968Natur.217..709H. doi:10.1038/217709a0. S2CID 4277613. For the follow-up paper, see Pilkington et al. 1968.
- "IOP and Professor Dame Jocelyn Bell Burnell launch new fund to encourage greater diversity in physics". Institute of Physics. 2019.
- "Jansky Home Page". National Radio Astronomy Observatory.
- "Jocelyn Bell Burnell Medal and Prize". Institute of Physics.
- "Jocelyn Bell Burnell profile". Contributions of 20th Century Women to Physics (CWP). Archived from the original on 7 July 2007.
- "Jocelyn Bell Burnell retires as Dean". University of Bath. 16 August 2004. Archived from the original on 29 May 2007.
- Johnston, Colin (March 2007). "Pulsar Pioneer visits us" (PDF). Astronotes. Armagh Planetarium. pp. 2–3. Archived from the original (PDF) on 25 February 2012.
- Judson, Horace (20 October 2003). "No Nobel Prize for Whining". The New York Times.
- Kaplan, Sarah; Farzan, Antonia Noori (8 September 2018). "She made the discovery, but a man got the Nobel. A half-century later, she's won a $3 million prize". The Washington Post.
- Kaufman, Rachel (24 June 2016). "Dame Jocelyn Bell-Burnell: No asking, just telling". College Park, MD: Sigma Pi Sigma.
- "Kleine grüne Männchen und pulsierende Sterne" [Pulsars and Little Green Men] (in German). Technical University Vienna. 11 November 2013.
- "Les lauréats des prix de l'Académie des sciences attribués en 2018" [2018 Laureates of the French Academy of Sciences Prize] (in French). Académie des sciences. 24 July 2018.
- "Lurgan College: School History". Archived from the original on 22 October 2016.
- "The Magellanic Premium of the American Philosophical Society". American Philosophical Society. 2008. Archived from the original on 17 April 2009.
- "Matteucci Medal". Accademia nazionale delle scienze. 2022.
- McGrayne, Sharon Bertsch (1993). Nobel Prize women in science: their lives, struggles, and momentous discoveries. Secaucus, New Jersey: Carol Publishing Group. pp. 359–379. ISBN 978-1-55972-146-2.
- McKie, Robin (2 October 2010). "Fred Hoyle: the scientist whose rudeness cost him a Nobel prize". The Guardian.
- McNaughton, Marion; Pegler, Linda; Arriens, Jan; Dale, Jonathan; Steven, Helen; Perks, Nick; Michaelis, Laurie (2007). Engaging with the Quaker Testimonies: a Toolkit. Quaker Books for Quaker Peace & Social Witness Testimonies Committee. ISBN 978-0-901689-59-7.
- Merali, Zeeya (6 September 2018). "Pulsar discoverer Jocelyn Bell Burnell wins $3-million Breakthrough Prize". Nature. 561 (7722): 161. Bibcode:2018Natur.561..161M. doi:10.1038/d41586-018-06210-w. ISSN 0028-0836. PMID 30206391. S2CID 52191212.
- Ouellette, Jennifer (6 September 2018). "Jocelyn Bell Burnell wins $3 million prize for discovering pulsars". Ars Technica.
- Pilkington, J. D. H.; Hewish, A.; Bell, S. J.; Cole, T. W. (1968). "Observations of some further Pulsed Radio Sources". Nature. 218 (5137): 126. Bibcode:1968Natur.218..126P. doi:10.1038/218126a0. S2CID 4253103. For the first paper (announcing the discovery), see Hewish et al. 1968.
- "President's medal recipients: Professor Dame Jocelyn Bell Burnell (full citation)". Institute of Physics. 2017.
- "Press Release: The 1974 Nobel Prize in Physics". Nobel Foundation. 15 October 1974.
- "Professor Dame Jocelyn Bell Burnell wins 2022 Jules Janssen Prize". Société astronomique de France.
- "Professor Jocelyn Bell Burnell FRS – Spectrum of astronomy". The Royal Society. n.d. Archived from the original on 14 October 2006.
- Proudfoot, Ben (27 July 2021). "She Changed Astronomy Forever. He Won the Nobel Prize For It". Opinion. The New York Times. (includes 16-minute video)
- "Queen's Birthday Honours 2007". University of Oxford. 18 June 2007. Archived from the original on 30 June 2007.
- "Royal Astronomical Society Honours Stars of Astronomy and Geophysics" (Press release). Royal Astronomical Society. 8 January 2021.
- "Royal Medal". Royal Society.
- Sample, Ian (6 September 2018). "British astrophysicist overlooked by Nobels wins $3m award for pulsar work". The Guardian.
- Schilling, Govert (1 August 2017). "50 Years of Pulsars". BBC Sky at Night Magazine – via Alles over sterrenkunde.
- Shearing, Hazel (6 February 2020). "Seven female scientists you may not have heard of – but should know all about". BBC News.
- "Special Breakthrough Prize in Fundamental Physics Awarded to Jocelyn Bell Burnell for Discovery of Pulsars" (Press release). Breakthrough Prize. 6 September 2018. "A Special Breakthrough Prize in Fundamental Physics can be awarded by the Selection Committee at any time, and in addition to the regular Breakthrough Prize awarded through the ordinary annual nomination process. Unlike the annual Breakthrough Prize in Fundamental Physics, the Special Prize is not limited to recent discoveries."
- Taraporevala, Kai (25 October 2020). "A Great Astronomer and Pulsars - The Story of Jocelyn Bell Burnell". The Long Form.
- Tesh, Sarah; Wade, Jess (2017). "Look happy dear, you've just made a discovery". Physics World. 30 (9): 31–33. Bibcode:2017PhyW...30i..31T. doi:10.1088/2058-7058/30/9/35. ISSN 0953-8585.
- "Trinity Monday 2020 - Fellows and Scholars". Trinity College Dublin. 20 April 2020.
- "Visiting star at college". Lurgan Mail. 13 February 2007. Archived from the original on 7 February 2018.
- Walter, Claire (1982). Winners, the blue ribbon encyclopedia of awards. Facts on File. p. 438. ISBN 978-0-87196-386-4 – via Internet Archive.
- Warren, Andrew; Thackray, Lucy (25 July 2018). "The pioneer of pulsars pops into Parkes". CSIROscope.
- Westly, Erica (6 October 2008). "No Nobel for You: Top 10 Nobel Snubs". Scientific American.
- "Who are the 100 Women 2014?". BBC News. 26 October 2014.
- "Woman's Hour – the Power List 2013". BBC. 1 January 1970.
- "Women of the Year Prudential Lifetime Achievement Award". Womenoftheyear.co.uk. Archived from the original on 6 January 2016.
- Yount, Lisa (2007). A to Z of Women in Science and Math. New York: Facts on File. pp. 24–25. ISBN 978-1-4381-0795-0.

Academic offices
Preceded by Baron Patel	Chancellor of the University of Dundee; 2018–2023	Succeeded by George Robertson
