= Behram Kurşunoğlu =

Turkish physicist (1922–2003)

- Born: March 14, 1922; Çaykara, Trabzon, Turkey
- Died: October 25, 2003 (aged 81); Miami, Florida, U.S.
- Education: University of Edinburgh (BA); University of Cambridge (PhD)
- Known for: Unified field theory
- Scientific career
- Fields: Physicist
- Workplaces: Middle East Technical University; University of Miami

Behram Kurşunoğlu (14 March 1922 – 25 October 2003) was a Turkish physicist and the founder and the director of the Center for Theoretical Studies, University of Miami. He was best known for his works on unified field theory, energy and global issues.

He participated in the discovery of two different types of neutrinos in late 1950s. During his University of Miami career, he hosted several Nobel Prize laureates, including Paul Dirac, Lars Onsager and Robert Hofstadter. He wrote several books on diverse aspects of physics, the most notable of which is Modern Quantum Theory (1962).

== Early life and education ==
Behram Kurşunoğlu was born in Çaykara district of Trabzon. While he was a third year student in the Department of Mathematics and Astronomy of İstanbul Yüksek Öğretmen Okulu, he was sent to University of Edinburgh through a scholarship of the Turkish Ministry of Education, in 1945.

After graduating from the University of Edinburgh, he completed his doctorate degree in physics at the University of Cambridge. During the period of 1956–1958, he served as the dean of the Faculty of Nuclear Sciences and Technology at Middle East Technical University and a counselor to the office of Turkish General Staff. He held teaching positions at several universities in the United States, and starting from 1958, professorship at the University of Miami.

== Career ==
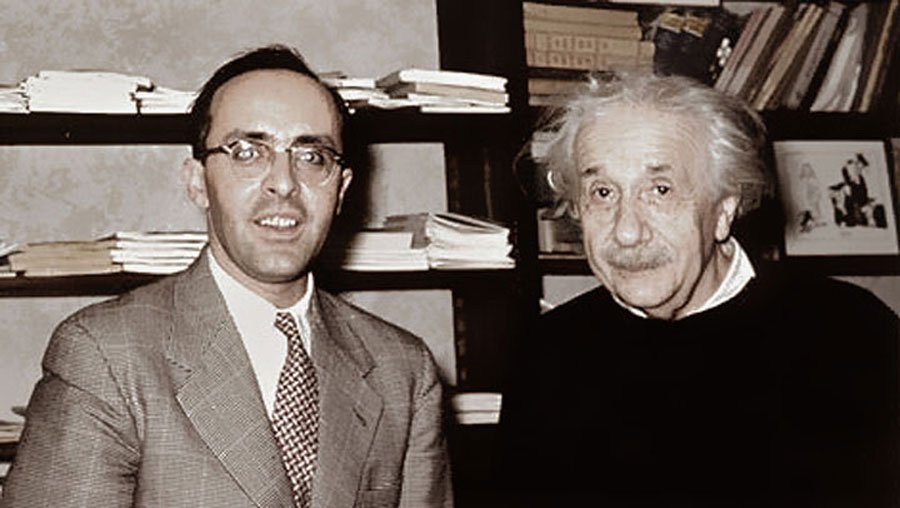
Behram Kurşunoğlu with Albert Einstein

In 1965, he acted as one of the founders of the Center for Theoretical Studies of the University of Miami, of which he became the first director. During this period, he also worked in counseling positions for several research organizations and laboratories in Europe. With the invitation of Russian Academy of Sciences, he worked as a visiting professor in the USSR during 1968.

He continued his work at the Center for Theoretical Studies of the University of Miami until 1992, after which he became the director of the Global Foundation research organization.

Kursunoglu died on October 25, 2003, due to heart attack, shortly before that year's Coral Gables Conference, which was a festschrift for Paul Frampton combined with a memorial for Kursunoglu in a conference series he had been organizing since 1964. He had three children, İsmet, Sevil and Ayda, from his wife Sevda Arif.

== Selected publications ==
- In Physical Review Letters:
1. 1951 On Einstein's Unified Field Theory
2. 1953 Derivation and Renormalization of the Tamm-Dancoff Equations
3. 1953 Expectations from a Unified Field Theory
4. 1953 Unified Field Theory and Born-Infeld Electrodynamics
- In Physical Review:
1. 1952 Gravitation and Electrodynamics
2. 1954 Tamm-Dancoff Methods and Nuclear Forces
3. 1956 Transformation of Relativistic Wave Equations
4. 1957 Proton Bremsstrahlung
5. 1963 Brownian Motion in a Magnetic Field
6. 1964 New Symmetry Group for Elementary Particles. I. Generalization of Lorentz Group Via Electrodynamics
7. 1967 Space-Time and Origin of Internal Symmetries
8. 1968 Dynamical Theory of Hadrons and Leptons
- In Physical Review D:
1. 1970 Theory of Relativistic Supermultiplets. I. Baryon SpectroscopyElectrodynamics
2. 1970 Theory of Relativistic Supermultiplets. II. Periodicities in Hadron Spectroscopy
3. 1974 Gravitation and magnetic charge
4. 1975 Erratum: Gravitation and magnetic charge
5. 1976 Consequences of nonlinearity in the generalized theory of gravitation
6. 1976 Velocity of light in generalized theory of gravitation
- In Journal of Mathematical Physics:
1. 1961 Complex Orthogonal and Antiorthogonal Representation of Lorentz Group
2. 1967 Unitary Representations of U(2, 2) and Massless Fields
- In Reviews of Modern Physics:
1. 1957 Correspondence in the Generalized Theory of Gravitation

== Awards ==
- Fellow of the American Physical Society (1965)
- TÜBİTAK Science Award (1972)
- Award of Phi Kappa Phi Honor Society
- Award of the Sigma Xi Scientific Research Society
- Sigma Pi Sigma Award
- "Science is Guidance" Award of the Atatürk Society of America (2001)
