= Half-exponential function =

Functional square root of an exponential

In mathematics, a half-exponential function is a functional square root of an exponential function. That is, a function $f$ such that $f$ composed with itself results in an exponential function:
$$f\bigl(f(x)\bigr) = ab^x,$$
for some constants $a$ and $b$.

Hellmuth Kneser first proposed a holomorphic construction of the solution of $f\bigl(f(x)\bigr) = e^x$ in 1950.

== Impossibility of a closed-form formula ==
If a function $f$ is defined using the standard arithmetic operations, exponentials, logarithms, and real-valued constants, then $f\bigl(f(x)\bigr)$ is either subexponential or superexponential. Thus, a Hardy L-function cannot be half-exponential.

== Construction ==
Any exponential function can be written as the self-composition $f(f(x))$ for infinitely many possible choices of $f$. In particular, for every $A$ in the open interval $(0,1)$ and for every continuous strictly increasing function $g$ from $[0,A]$ onto $[A,1]$, there is an extension of this function to a continuous strictly increasing function $f$ on the real numbers such that $f\bigl(f(x)\bigr)=\exp x$. The function $f$ is the unique solution to the functional equation
$$f (x) =
\begin{cases}
g (x) & \mbox{if } x \in [0,A], \\
\exp g^{-1} (x) & \mbox{if } x \in (A,1], \\
\exp f ( \ln x) & \mbox{if } x \in (1,\infty), \\
\ln f ( \exp x) & \mbox{if } x \in (-\infty,0). \\
\end{cases}$$

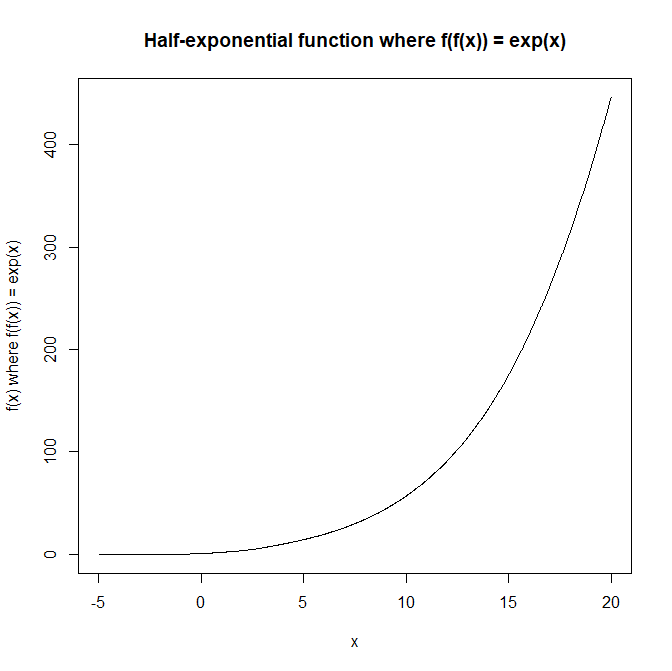
Example of a half-exponential function

A simple example, which leads to $f$ having a continuous first derivative $f'$ everywhere, and also causes $f''\ge 0$ everywhere (i.e. $f(x)$ is concave-up, and $f'(x)$ increasing, for all real $x$), is to take $A=\tfrac12$ and $g(x)=x+\tfrac12$, giving
$$f (x) =
\begin{cases}
\ln\left(e^x +\tfrac12\right) & \mbox{if } x \le -\ln 2, \\
e^x - \tfrac12 & \mbox{if } {-\ln 2} \le x \le 0, \\
x +\tfrac12 & \mbox{if } 0 \le x \le \tfrac12, \\
e^{x-1/2} & \mbox{if } \tfrac12 \le x \le 1 , \\
x \sqrt{e} & \mbox{if } 1 \le x \le \sqrt{e} , \\
e^{x / \sqrt{e}} & \mbox{if } \sqrt{e} \le x \le e , \\
x^{\sqrt{e}} & \mbox{if } e \le x \le e^{\sqrt{e}} , \\
e^{x^{1/\sqrt{e}}}  & \mbox{if } e^{\sqrt{e}} \le x \le e^e , \ldots\\
\end{cases}$$
Crone and Neuendorffer claim that there is no semi-exponential function f(x) that is both (a) analytic and (b) always maps reals to reals. The piecewise solution above achieves goal (b) but not (a). Achieving goal (a) is possible by writing $e^x$ as a Taylor series based at a fixpoint Q (there are an infinitude of such fixpoints, but they all are nonreal complex, for example $Q=0.3181315+1.3372357i$), making Q also be a fixpoint of f, that is $f(Q)=e^Q=Q$, then computing the Maclaurin series coefficients of $f(x-Q)$ one by one. This results in Kneser's holomorphic solution.

The construction of Kneser's solution is closely related to the problem of extending tetration to non-integer values; the value of ${}^{1/2} a$ can be understood as the value of $f(1)$, where $f(x)$ satisfies $f\bigl(f(x)\bigr) = a^x$. Example values from Kneser's solution of $f\bigl(f(x)\bigr) = e^x$ include $f(0) \approx 0.49856$ and $f\bigl(1) \approx 1.64635$.

== Application ==
Half-exponential functions are used in computational complexity theory for growth rates "intermediate" between polynomial and exponential. A function $f$ grows at least as quickly as some half-exponential function (its composition with itself grows exponentially) if it is non-decreasing and $f^{-1}(x^C)=o(\log x)$, for every $C>0$.

== See also ==
- Iterated function – Result of repeatedly applying a mathematical function
- Schröder's equation – Equation for fixed point of functional composition
- Abel equation – Equation for function that computes iterated values
