= Superfunction =

In mathematics, superfunction is a nonstandard name for an iterated function for complexified continuous iteration index. Roughly, for some function f and for some variable x, the superfunction could be defined by the expression

$$S(z;x) = \underbrace{f\Big(f\big(\dots f(x)\dots\big)\Big)}_{z \text{ evaluations of the function}\, f} .$$

Then, S(z; x) can be interpreted as the superfunction of the function f(x). Such a definition is valid only for a positive integer index z. The variable x is often omitted. Much study and many applications of superfunctions employ various extensions of these superfunctions to complex and continuous indices; and the analysis of existence, uniqueness and their evaluation. The Ackermann functions and tetration can be interpreted in terms of superfunctions.

== History ==
Analysis of superfunctions arose from applications of the evaluation of fractional iterations of functions. Superfunctions and their inverses allow evaluation of not only the first negative power of a function (inverse function), but also of any real and even complex iterate of that function. Historically, an early function of this kind considered was $\sqrt{\exp}$; the function $\sqrt{\,!\;}$ has then been used as the logo of the physics department of the Moscow State University.

At that time, these investigators did not have computational access for the evaluation of such functions, but the function $\sqrt{\exp}$ was luckier than $\sqrt{\,!\;}$: at the very least, the existence of the holomorphic function $\varphi$ such that $\varphi(\varphi(u))=\exp(u)$ had been demonstrated in 1950 by Hellmuth Kneser.

Relying on the elegant functional conjugacy theory of Schröder's equation, for his proof, Kneser had constructed the "superfunction" of the exponential map through the corresponding Abel function $\mathcal{X}$, satisfying the related Abel equation

$$\mathcal{X}(\exp(u))=\mathcal{X}(u)+1.\$$

so that $\mathcal{X}(S(z;u))=\mathcal{X}(u)+z\$. The inverse function Kneser found,

$$S(z;u)=\mathcal{X}^{-1}(z+\mathcal{X}(u))$$

is an entire super-exponential, although it is not real on the real axis; it cannot be interpreted as tetrational, because the condition $S(0;x)=x$ cannot be realized for the entire super-exponential. The real $\sqrt{\exp}$ can be constructed with the tetrational (which is also a superexponential); while the real $\sqrt{\,!\;}$ can be constructed with the superfactorial.

There is a book dedicated to superfunctions.

== Extensions ==
The recurrence formula of the above preamble can be written as

$$S(z + 1;x)=f(S(z;x)) ~~~~~~~~ \forall z\in \mathbb{N} : z>0$$
$$S(1)=f(x).$$

Instead of the last equation, one could write the identity function,

$$S(0)=x~,$$

and extend the range of definition of the superfunction S to the non-negative integers. Then, one may posit

$$S(-1)=f^{-1}(x),$$

and extend the range of validity to the integer values larger than −2.

The following extension, for example,

$$S(-2)=f^{-2}(x)$$

is not trivial, because the inverse function may happen to be not defined for some values of $x$. In particular, tetration can be interpreted as superfunction of exponentiation for some real base $b$; in this case,

$$f=\exp_{b}.$$

Then, at x = 1,

$$S(-1) = \log_b 1 = 0,$$

but

$$S(-2) = \log_b 0$$

is not defined.

For extension to non-integer values of the argument, the superfunction should be defined in a different way.

For complex numbers $a$ and $b$ such that $a$ belongs to some connected domain $D \subseteq \mathbb{C}$, the superfunction (from $a$ to $b$) of a holomorphic function f on the domain $D$ is a function $S$, holomorphic on domain $D$, such that

$$S(z\!+\!1)=f(S(z)) ~ \forall z\in D : z\!+\!1 \in D\$$
$$S(a)=b.\$$

== Uniqueness ==
In general, the superfunction is not unique. For a given base function $f$, from a given $(a\mapsto d)$ superfunction $S$, another $(a\mapsto d)$ superfunction $G$ could be constructed as

$$G(z) = S(z+\mu(z))\$$

where $\mu$ is any 1-periodic function, holomorphic at least in some vicinity of the real axis, such that $\mu(a)=0$.

The modified superfunction may have a narrower range of holomorphy. The variety of possible superfunctions is especially large in the limiting case, when the width of the range of holomorphy becomes zero; in this case, one deals with real-analytic superfunctions.

If the range of holomorphy required is large enough, then the superfunction is expected to be unique, at least in some specific base functions $H$. In particular, the $(C, 0\mapsto 1)$ superfunction of $\exp_b$, for $b>1$, is called tetration and is believed to be unique, at least for $C= \{ z \in \mathbb{C} ~:~\Re(z)>-2 \}$; for the case $b>\exp(1/\mathrm{e})$, but up to 2009, the uniqueness was a conjecture and not a theorem with a formal mathematical proof.

== Examples ==
This short collection of elementary superfunctions is illustrated in. Some superfunctions can be expressed through elementary functions; they are used without mention that they are superfunctions. For example, for the transfer function "++", which means unit increment, the superfunction is just addition of a constant.

=== Addition ===
Chose a complex number $c$ and define the function $\mathrm{add}_c$ by $\mathrm{add}_c(x)=c+x$ for all $x \in \mathbb{C}$. Further define the function $\mathrm{mul_c}$ by $\mathrm{mul_c}(x)=c \cdot x$ for all $x \in \mathbb{C}$.

Then, the function $S(z;x)=x+\mathrm{mul_c}(z)$ is the superfunction (0 to c) of the function $\mathrm{add_c}$ on C.

=== Multiplication ===
Exponentiation $\exp_c$ is superfunction (from 1 to $c$) of function $\mathrm{mul}_c$.

=== Quadratic polynomials ===
The examples except the last one, below, are essentially from Schröder's pioneering 1870 paper.

Let $f(x)=2 x^2-1$. Then,

$$S(z;x)=\cos( 2^z \arccos(x))$$

is a $(\mathbb{C},~ 0\! \rightarrow\! 1)$ superfunction (iteration orbit) of f.

Indeed,

$$S(z+1;x)=\cos(2 \cdot 2^z \arccos (x))=2\cos( 2^z \arccos (x))^2 -1 = f(S(z;x))\$$

and $S(0;x)=x.$

In this case, the superfunction $S$ is periodic, with period $T=\frac{2\pi}{\ln(2)} i\approx 9.0647202836543876194 \!~i$; and the superfunction approaches unity in the negative direction on the real axis:

$$\lim_{z\rightarrow -\infty} S(z)=1.\$$

=== Algebraic function ===
Similarly,

$$f(x)=2x \sqrt{1-x^2}$$

has an iteration orbit

$$S(z;x)=\sin( 2^z\arcsin (x)).$$

=== Rational function ===
In general, the transfer (step) function f(x) need not be an entire function. An example involving a meromorphic function f reads,

$f(x)=\frac{2x}{1-x^2} ~~~~~ \forall x \in D$; $~ D=\mathbb{C} \setminus \{-1,1\}.$

Its iteration orbit (superfunction) is

$$S(z;x)=\tan( 2^z \arctan(x))$$

on C, the set of complex numbers except for the singularities of the function S. To see this, recall the double angle trigonometric formula

$$\tan(2 \alpha)=\frac{2 \tan(\alpha)}{1-\tan(\alpha)^2}~~
\forall \alpha \in \mathbb{C} \setminus \{\alpha \in \mathbb{C} : \cos(\alpha)=0 \text{ or } \sin(\alpha)=\pm \cos(\alpha)  \}.$$

=== Exponentiation ===
Let $b>1$, $f(u) = \exp_b(u)$, $C = \{ z \in \mathbb{C} : \Re(u)>-2 \}$. The tetration $\mathrm{tet}_b$ is then a $(C,~ 0\! \rightarrow\! 1)$ superfunction of $\exp_b$.

== Abel function ==
The inverse of a superfunction for a suitable argument x can be interpreted as the Abel function, the solution of the Abel equation,

$$\mathcal{X}(\exp(u))=\mathcal{X}(u)+1.\$$

and hence

$$\mathcal{X}(S(z;u))=\mathcal{X}(u)+z.\$$

The inverse function when defined, is

$$S(z;u)=\mathcal{X}^{-1}(z+\mathcal{X}(u)),$$

for suitable domains and ranges, when they exist. The recursive property of S is then self-evident.

The figure at left shows an example of transition from $\exp^{1}\!=\!\exp$ to $\exp^{\!-1}\!=\!\ln$. The iterated function $\exp^z$ versus real argument is plotted for $z=2,1,0.9, 0.5, 0.1, -0.1,-0.5, -0.9, -1,-2$. The tetrational and ArcTetrational were used as superfunction $S$ and Abel function $A$ of the exponential. The figure at right shows these functions in the complex plane. At non-negative integer number of iteration, the iterated exponential is an entire function; at non-integer values, it has two branch points, which correspond to the fixed point $L$ and $L^*$ of natural logarithm. At $z \!\ge\! 0$, function $\exp^z(x)$ remains holomorphic at least in the strip $|\Im(z)|<\Im(L)\approx 1.3$ along the real axis.

== Applications of superfunctions and Abel functions ==
Superfunctions, usually the superexponentials, are proposed as a fast-growing function for an upgrade of the floating point representation of numbers in computers. Such an upgrade would greatly extend the range of huge numbers which are still distinguishable from infinity.

Other applications include the calculation of fractional iterates (or fractional powers) of a function. Any holomorphic function can be identified to a transfer function, and then its superfunctions and corresponding Abel functions can be considered.

Nonlinear optics

In the investigation of the nonlinear response of optical materials, the sample is supposed to be optically thin, in such a way that the intensity of the light does not change much as it goes through. Then one can consider, for example, the absorption as function of the intensity. However, at small variation of the intensity in the sample, the precision of measurement of the absorption as function of intensity is not good. The reconstruction of the superfunction from the transfer function allows to work with relatively thick samples, improving the precision of measurements. In particular, the transfer function of the similar sample, which is half thinner, could be interpreted as the square root (i.e. half-iteration) of the transfer function of the initial sample.

Similar example is suggested for a nonlinear optical fiber.

Nonlinear acoustics

It may make sense to characterize the nonlinearities in the attenuation of shock waves in a homogeneous tube. This could find an application in some advanced muffler, using nonlinear acoustic effects to withdraw the energy of the sound waves without to disturb the flux of the gas. Again, the analysis of the nonlinear response, i.e. the transfer function, may be boosted with the superfunction.

Evaporation and condensation

In analysis of condensation, the growth (or vaporization) of a small drop of liquid can be considered, as it diffuses down through a tube with some uniform concentration of vapor. In the first approximation, at fixed concentration of the vapor, the mass of the drop at the output end can be interpreted as the transfer function of the input mass. The square root of this transfer function will characterize the tube of half length.

Snow avalanche

The mass of a snowball that rolls down a hill can be considered as a function of the path it has already passed. At fixed length of this path (that can be determined by the altitude of the hill) this mass can be considered also as a transfer function of the input mass. The mass of the snowball could be measured at the top of the hill and at the bottom, giving the transfer function; then, the mass of the snowball, as a function of the length it passed, is a superfunction.

Operational element

If one needs to build up an operational element with some given transfer function $H$, and wants to realize it as a sequential connection of a couple of identical operational elements, then each of these two elements should have transfer function $h=\sqrt{H}$. Such a function can be evaluated through the superfunction and the Abel function of the transfer function $H$.

The operational element may have any origin: it can be realized as an electronic microchip, or a mechanical couple of curvilinear grains, or some asymmetric U-tube filled with different liquids, and so on.
