= Functional relation =

Functional relation may refer to

- A binary relation that is the graph of a function or a partial function
- An alternative name for a functional equation
