= Hellmuth Kneser =

German mathematician

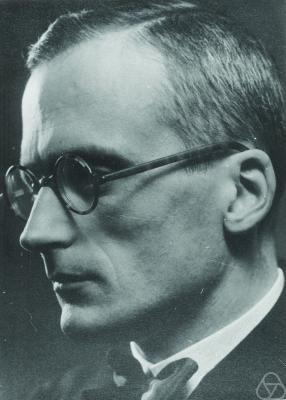
- Hellmuth Kneser, ca. 1930.
- Born: 16 April 1898
- Died: 23 August 1973 (aged 75)
- Education: University of Göttingen
- Known for: Normal function Prime decomposition of 3-manifolds Superfunction; Radó–Kneser–Choquet theorem
- Scientific career
- Fields: Mathematics
- Workplaces: University of Tübingen
- Doctoral advisor: David Hilbert
- Doctoral students: Reinhold Baer, Wolfgang Walter, Karl H. Hofmann

Hellmuth Kneser (16 April 1898 – 23 August 1973) was a German mathematician who made notable contributions to group theory and topology. His most famous result may be his theorem on the existence of a prime decomposition for 3-manifolds. His proof originated the concept of normal surface, a fundamental cornerstone of the theory of 3-manifolds.

He was born in Dorpat, Russian Empire (now Tartu, Estonia) and died in Tübingen, Germany. He was the son of the mathematician Adolf Kneser and the father of the mathematician Martin Kneser. He assisted Wilhelm Süss in the founding of the Mathematical Research Institute of Oberwolfach and served as the director of the institute from 1958 to 1959. He was an editor of Mathematische Zeitschrift, Archiv der Mathematik and Aequationes Mathematicae.

Kneser formulated the problem of non-integer iteration of functions and proved the existence of the entire Abel function of the exponential; on the base of this Abel function, he constructed the functional square root of the exponential function as a half-iteration of the exponential, i.e. a function φ such that φ(φ(z)) = exp(z).

Kneser was a student of David Hilbert. He was an advisor of a number of notable mathematicians, including Reinhold Baer.

Hellmuth Kneser was a member of the NSDAP and also the SA. In July 1934 he wrote to Ludwig Bieberbach a short note supporting his antisemitic views and stating: "May God grant German science a unitary, powerful and continued political position."

== Selected publications ==
- Funktionentheorie. Studia Mathematica, Göttingen, 1958; 2nd edition 1966.
- Gerhard Betsch, Karl H. Hofmann (eds.): Gesammelte Abhandlungen, De Gruyter 2005; 2011 pbk reprint
