= Koenigs function =

In mathematics, the Koenigs function is a function arising in complex analysis and dynamical systems. Introduced in 1884 by the French mathematician Gabriel Koenigs, it gives a canonical representation as dilations of a univalent holomorphic mapping, or a semigroup of mappings, of the unit disk in the complex numbers into itself.

== Existence and uniqueness of Koenigs function ==
Let D be the unit disk in the complex numbers. Let f be a holomorphic function mapping D into itself, fixing the point 0, with f not identically 0 and f not an automorphism of D, i.e. a Möbius transformation defined by a matrix in SU(1,1).

By the Denjoy-Wolff theorem, f leaves invariant each disk |z | < r and the iterates of f converge uniformly on compacta to 0: in fact for 0 < r < 1,

$$|f(z)|\le M(r) |z|$$

for |z | ≤ r with M(r ) < 1. Moreover f '(0) = λ with 0 < |λ| < 1.

Koenigs (1884) proved that there is a unique holomorphic function h defined on D, called the Koenigs function, such that h(0) = 0, h '(0) = 1 and Schröder's equation is satisfied,

$$h(f(z))= f^\prime(0) h(z) ~.$$

The function h is the uniform limit on compacta of the normalized iterates, $g_n(z)= \lambda^{-n} f^n(z)$.

Moreover, if f is univalent, so is h.

As a consequence, when f (and hence h) are univalent, D can be identified with the open domain U = h(D). Under this conformal identification, the mapping f becomes multiplication by λ, a dilation on U.

=== Proof ===
- Uniqueness. If k is another solution then, by analyticity, it suffices to show that k = h near 0. Let

$$H=k\circ h^{-1} (z)$$

near 0. Thus H(0) =0, H'(0)=1 and, for |z | small,

$$\lambda H(z)=\lambda h(k^{-1} (z)) = h(f(k^{-1}(z))=h(k^{-1}(\lambda z)= H(\lambda z)~.$$

Substituting into the power series for H, it follows that H(z) = z near 0. Hence h = k near 0.

- Existence. If $F(z)=f(z)/\lambda z,$ then by the Schwarz lemma

$$|F(z) - 1|\le (1+|\lambda|^{-1})|z|~.$$

On the other hand,

$$g_n(z) = z\prod_{j=0}^{n-1} F(f^j(z))~.$$

Hence g_{n} converges uniformly for |z| ≤ r by the Weierstrass M-test since

$$\sum \sup_{|z|\le r} |1 -F\circ f^j(z)| \le (1+|\lambda|^{-1}) \sum M(r)^j <\infty.$$

- Univalence. By Hurwitz's theorem, since each g^{n} is univalent and normalized, i.e. fixes 0 and has derivative 1 there, their limit h is also univalent.

== Koenigs function of a semigroup ==
Let f_{t} (z) be a semigroup of holomorphic univalent mappings of D into itself fixing 0 defined for t ∈ [0, ∞) such that

- $f_s$ is not an automorphism for s > 0
- $f_s(f_t(z))=f_{t+s}(z)$
- $f_0(z)=z$
- $f_t(z)$ is jointly continuous in t and z

Each f_{s} with s > 0 has the same Koenigs function, cf. iterated function. In fact, if h is the Koenigs function of f = f_{1}, then h(f_{s}(z)) satisfies Schroeder's equation and hence is proportion to h.

Taking derivatives gives

$$h(f_s(z)) =f_s^\prime(0) h(z).$$

Hence h is the Koenigs function of f_{s}.

== Structure of univalent semigroups ==
On the domain U = h(D), the maps f_{s} become multiplication by $\lambda(s)=f_s^\prime(0)$, a continuous semigroup. So $\lambda(s)= e^{\mu s}$ where μ is a uniquely determined solution of e ^{μ} = λ with Reμ < 0. It follows that the semigroup is differentiable at 0. Let

$$v(z)=\partial_t f_t(z)|_{t=0},$$

a holomorphic function on D with v(0) = 0 and v'(0) = μ.

Then

$$\partial_t (f_t(z)) h^\prime(f_t(z))= \mu e^{\mu t} h(z)=\mu h(f_t(z)),$$

so that

$$v=v^\prime(0) {h\over h^\prime}$$

and

$$\partial_t f_t(z) = v(f_t(z)),\,\,\, f_t(z)=0  ~,$$

the flow equation for a vector field.

Restricting to the case with 0 < λ < 1, the h(D) must be starlike so that

$$\Re {zh^\prime(z)\over h(z)} \ge 0  ~.$$

Since the same result holds for the reciprocal,

$$\Re {v(z)\over z}\le 0 ~,$$

so that v(z) satisfies the conditions of Berkson & Porta (1978)

$$v(z)= z p(z),\,\,\, \Re p(z) \le 0, \,\,\, p^\prime(0) < 0.$$

Conversely, reversing the above steps, any holomorphic vector field v(z) satisfying these conditions is associated to a semigroup f_{t}, with

$$h(z)= z \exp \int_0^z {v^\prime(0) \over v(w)} -{1\over w} \, dw.$$
