= Lucjan Böttcher =

Polish mathematician (1872–1937)

Lucjan Emil Böttcher
- Born: January 21, 1872; Warsaw, Congress Poland, Russian Empire
- Died: May 29, 1937 (aged 65); Lwów, Poland
- Citizenship: Poland
- Education: Lwów Polytechnic School, University of Leipzig
- Known for: Böttcher's equation
- Scientific career
- Thesis: Beiträge zu der Theorie der Iterationsrechnung (1898)
- Doctoral advisor: Sophus Lie

Lucjan Emil Böttcher (January 21, 1872 – May 29, 1937) was a Polish mathematician notable for his pioneering contributions to the theory of iteration and early developments in holomorphic dynamics, including Böttcher's equation and Böttcher's theorem. He worked in Lvov at the beginning of the 20th century.

== Early life ==
Böttcher was born on January 21, 1872, in Warsaw, Poland. He attended private schools in Warsaw and graduated from the classical gymnasium in Łomża in 1893, after which he entered the Imperial University of Warsaw in the Division of Mathematics and Physics. At the time, Russian was the language of instruction at the university, as Warsaw was under Russian rule.

In 1894, Böttcher was expelled from the Imperial University of Warsaw following his participation in student demonstrations with a patriotic character during the period of Russian political control. He transferred to Lwów Polytechnic School, where he earned a partial diploma (a qualification below the level of a full degree) in 1897. Desiring to continue his mathematical education, he moved to Leipzig, where he worked under Sophus Lie. His doctoral thesis, published in 1898, was titled Beiträge zu der Theorie der Iterationsrechnung.

Böttcher married Maria Wolle in 1900, and had four children.

== Career ==
Following his doctorate, Böttcher returned to Lwów to take up a junior position at the Lwów Polytechnic School. By 1911, he was licensed to teach (venia legendi) at the school, and he offered courses on theoretical mechanics as well as mathematics for engineering. All his attempts to obtain habilitation at the University of Lwów failed, however. This meant that he was not permitted to guide doctoral students.

Böttcher was a member of the Polish Mathematical Society. He took seriously his role of an educator, encouraging the introduction of differential and integral calculus at school level, and writing several high-school textbooks. One example is Principles of Elementary Algebra, adapted to the curriculum in the Polish Kingdom (1911), which followed the so-called Meran programme that aimed to teach students to think in terms of functions.

=== Main works ===
Böttcher's research focused on iterations of rational mappings on the Riemann sphere, where he introduced what is now known as Böttcher's equation and made early contributions to the foundational ideas of holomorphic dynamics. His name is attached to Böttcher theorem, in which he introduced Böttcher's equation and solved it under certain assumptions. He obtained results about the orbits of iterated rational maps, studied their convergence regions (Fatou components) and boundaries (Julia set); he also gave examples of everywhere chaotic maps constructed via elliptic functions. His construction of rational maps with a chaotic set equal to the entire Riemann sphere preceded the later Lattès examples by more than two decades, an observation noted in historical accounts of complex dynamics.

=== Academic reception ===
Böttcher was one of the founders of Holomorphic dynamics, which he viewed as a part of the mathematical theory of iterational calculus. His applications for habilitation at the University of Lwów in 1901 and subsequent years were unsuccessful; committee reports criticized aspects of his early publications for unclear exposition and methodological issues. Seventeen years later, with more publications to his name, he approached the University again for habilitation, but his request was denied. According to committee reports from the habilitation reviews, some reviewers judged that certain arguments in his papers lacked formal clarity and rigor, contributing to the decision not to grant habilitation.

As Böttcher worked in a mathematical discipline considerably removed from the interests of other Lwów mathematicians, he found little support from his peers. Indeed, his partial results and conclusions were forgotten, and a complete theory came about only decades later following the independent investigations of Pierre Fatou, Gaston Julia, Samuel Lattès and Salvatore Pincherle.

== Later life ==
Böttcher retired from the Polytechnic School in 1935. He died in Lwów on May 29, 1937.

== Selected bibliography ==
=== Papers ===
1. Beiträge zu der Theorie der Iterationsrechnung (Ph.D.). Oswald Schmidt. 1898.
2. "Zasady rachunku iteracyjnego (część pierwsza, część druga)". Prace Matematyczno Fizyczne. X: 65–86, 86–101. 1899–1900.
3. "Zasady rachunku iteracyjnego (część III)". Prace Matematyczno Fizyczne. XII: 95–111. 1901.
4. "Zasady rachunku iteracyjnego (część III, dokończenie)". Prace Matematyczno Fizyczne. XIII: 353–371. 1902.
5. "Glavnyshiye zakony skhodimosti iteratsiy i ikh prilozheniya k' analizu". Bulletin de la Société Physico-Mathématique de Kasan. XIII (1): 137. 1903.
6. "Glavnyshiye zakony skhodimosti iteratsiy i ikh prilozheniya k' analizu". Bulletin de la Société Physico-Mathématique de Kasan. XIV (2): 155–200. 1904.
7. "Glavnyshiye zakony skhodimosti iteratsiy i ikh prilozheniya k' analizu". Bulletin de la Société Physico-Mathématique de Kasan. XIV (3): 201–234. 1904.

=== Textbooks ===
1. Principles of geometry with numerous exercises. Warsaw: M. Arct. 1908.
2. Principles of Elementary Algebra, adapted to the curriculum in the Polish Kingdom. Warsaw. 1911.

== See also ==
- Böttcher's equation
- Complex dynamics
