= Hans Heinrich Bürmann =

German mathematician and teacher

Hans Heinrich Bürmann (died 21 June 1817, in Mannheim) was a German mathematician and teacher. He ran an "academy of commerce" in Mannheim since 1795 where he taught mathematics. He also served as a censor in Mannheim. He was nominated Headmaster of the Commerce Academy of the Grand Duchy of Baden in 1811. He did scientific research in the area of combinatorics and he contributed to the development of the symbolic language of mathematics. He discovered the generalized form of the Lagrange inversion theorem. He corresponded and published with Joseph Louis Lagrange and Carl Hindenburg.

== Iterate function composition notation ==
The compositional notation $f^{ n}$ for the $n$-th iterate $f^{n} := f\circ f^{n-1} = \overbrace {f\circ f\circ\dotsb\circ f}^{n \text{ times}}$ of function $f$ was originally introduced by Bürmann and later independently suggested by John Frederick William Herschel in 1813.

== See also ==
- Bürmann series
- Lagrange–Bürmann formula
