= Radó–Kneser–Choquet theorem =

Poisson integrals of homeomorphisms are diffeomorphisms

In mathematics, the Radó–Kneser–Choquet theorem, named after Tibor Radó, Hellmuth Kneser and Gustave Choquet, states that the Poisson integral of a homeomorphism of the unit circle is a harmonic diffeomorphism of the open unit disk. The result was stated as a problem by Radó and solved shortly afterwards by Kneser in 1926. Choquet, unaware of the work of Radó and Kneser, rediscovered the result with a different proof in 1945. Choquet also generalized the result to the Poisson integral of a homeomorphism from the unit circle to a simple Jordan curve bounding a convex region.

== Statement ==
Let f be an orientation-preserving homeomorphism of the unit circle |z| = 1 in C and define the Poisson integral of f by

$$\displaystyle{F_f(re^{i\theta}) ={1\over 2\pi} \int_0^{2\pi} f(\varphi)\cdot {1- r^2\over 1 - 2r\cos (\theta -\varphi) + r^2}\,d\varphi,}$$

for r < 1. Standard properties of the Poisson integral show that F_{f} is a harmonic function on |z| < 1 which extends by continuity to f on |z| = 1. With the additional assumption that f is orientation-preserving homeomorphism of this circle, F_{f} is an orientation preserving diffeomorphism of the open unit disk.

== Proof ==
To prove that F_{f} is locally an orientation-preserving diffeomorphism, it suffices to show that the Jacobian at a point a in the unit disk is positive. This Jacobian is given by

$$\displaystyle{J_f(a)=|\partial_zF_f(a)|^2 - |\partial_{\overline{z}} F_f(a)|^2.}$$

On the other hand, that g is a Möbius transformation preserving the unit circle and the unit disk,

$$\displaystyle{F_{f\circ g}=F_f \circ g.}$$

Taking g so that g(a) = 0 and taking the change of variable ζ = g(z), the chain rule gives

$$\displaystyle{(F_f\circ g)_z= [(F_f)_\zeta \circ g]\cdot g_z, \,\, (F_f\circ g)_{\overline{z}}=[(F_{f})_{\overline{\zeta}} \circ g] \cdot\overline{g_z}.}$$

It follows that

$$\displaystyle{J_{f\circ g}(a)= J_f(0)\cdot |g_z(a)|^2.}$$

It is therefore enough to prove positivity of the Jacobian when a = 0. In that case

$$\displaystyle{J_f(0)=|a_{1}|^2 - |a_{-1}|^2,}$$

where the a_{n} are the Fourier coefficients of f:

$$\displaystyle{a_n={1\over 2\pi}\int_0^{2\pi} f(e^{i\theta}) e^{-in\theta}\, d\theta.}$$

Following Douady & Earle (1986), the Jacobian at 0 can be expressed as a double integral

$$\displaystyle{|a_{1}|^2 - |a_{-1}|^2={1\over 4\pi^2}\int_0^{2\pi}\int_0^{2\pi} \Re [f(e^{i\theta})\overline{f(e^{i\varphi})} (e^{i(\theta-\varphi)}-e^{-i(\theta-\varphi)})]\,d\theta\, d\varphi.}$$

Writing

$$\displaystyle{f(e^{i\theta})=e^{ih(\theta)},}$$

where h is a strictly increasing continuous function satisfying

$$\displaystyle{h(\theta+2\pi)=h(\theta) +2\pi},$$

the double integral can be rewritten as

$$\displaystyle{|a_{1}|^2 - |a_{-1}|^2={1\over 2 \pi^2} \int_0^{2\pi}\int_0^{2\pi} \sin (\theta-\varphi) \sin(h(\theta)-h(\varphi))\,d\theta\,d\varphi={1\over 2 \pi^2} \int_0^{2\pi}\int_0^{2\pi} \sin (\theta) \sin(h(\theta+\varphi)-h(\varphi))\,d\theta\,d\varphi.}$$

Hence

$$\displaystyle{|a_{1}|^2 - |a_{-1}|^2={1\over 2 \pi^2} \int_0^{\pi}\sin \theta \int_0^\pi R(\theta,\varphi)\,d\varphi\,d\theta,}$$

where

$$R(\theta,\varphi)= \sin(h(\varphi+\theta) - h(\varphi)) + \sin(h(\varphi+2\pi)-h(\varphi+\theta +\pi)) + \sin(h(\varphi+\theta +\pi) -h(\varphi +\pi)) + \sin(h(\varphi+\pi) - h(\varphi+\theta)).$$

This formula gives R as the sum of the sines of four non-negative angles with sum 2π, so it is always non-negative. But then the Jacobian at 0 is strictly positive and F_{f} is therefore locally a diffeomorphism.

It remains to deduce F_{f} is a homeomorphism. By continuity its image is compact so closed. The non-vanishing of the Jacobian, implies that F_{f} is an open mapping on the unit disk, so that the image of the open disk is open. Hence the image of the closed disk is an open and closed subset of the closed disk. By connectivity, it must be the whole disk. For |w| < 1, the inverse image of w is closed, so compact, and entirely contained in the open disk. Since F_{f} is locally a homeomorphism, it must be a finite set. The set of points w in the open disk with exactly n preimages is open. By connectivity every point has the same number N of preimages. Since the open disk is simply connected, N = 1. In fact taking any preimage of the origin, every radial line has a unique lifting to a preimage, and so there is an open subset of the unit disk mapping homeomorphically onto the open disk. If N > 1, its complement would also have to be open, contradicting connectivity.
