= Marek Kuczma =

Polish mathematician (1935–1991)

Marek Kuczma (10 October 1935 in Katowice – 13 June 1991 in Katowice) was a Polish mathematician working mostly in the area of functional equations. He wrote several influential monographs in this field.

== Bibliography ==
- Kuczma, Marek (1968). Functional equations in a single variable. Warszawa: PWN.
- Kuczma, Marek; Choczewski, Bogdan; Ger, Roman (1990). Iterative functional equations. Cambridge: Cambridge University Press. ISBN 0-521-35561-3.
- Kuczma, Marek (2009). Attila Gilányi (ed.). An introduction to the theory of functional equations and inequalities: Cauchy's equation and Jensen's inequality (2nd ed.). Basel: Birkhäuser. ISBN 9783764387495.
