= Gabriel Xavier Paul Koenigs =

French mathematician

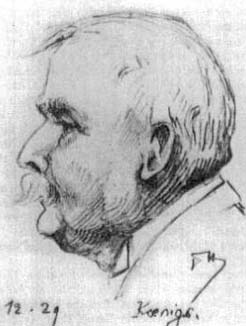
- Portrait of Gabriel Koenigs, December 1929
- Born: 17 January 1858; Toulouse, France
- Died: 29 October 1931 (aged 73); Paris, France
- Occupation: Mathematician
- Awards: Poncelet Prize
- Scientific career
- Thesis: Sur les propriétés infinitésimales de l'espace réglé (1882)

Gabriel Xavier Paul Koenigs (17 January 1858 in Toulouse, France – 29 October 1931 in Paris, France) was a French mathematician who worked on analysis and geometry. He was elected as Secretary General of the Executive Committee of the International Mathematical Union after World War I, and used his position to exclude countries with whom France had been at war from the mathematical congresses.

He was awarded the Poncelet Prize for 1893.

== Publications ==
- Koenigs G. Recherches sur les intégrals de certaines équations fontionnelles. Ann. École Normale, Suppl., 1884, (3)1.
- Leçons de l'agrégation classique de mathématiques. A. Hermann. 1892.
- Mémoire sur les lignes géodésiques. Paris: Imp. nationale. 1894.
- La géométrie réglée et ses applications. Gauthier-Villars. 1895.
- Leçons de cinématique. Paris: A. Hermann. 1897.
- Introduction a une théorie nouvelle des mechanismes. A. Hermann. 1905.

== See also ==
- Koenigs function
- Schröder's equation
