= Infinite compositions of analytic functions =

Mathematical theory

In mathematics, infinite compositions of analytic functions (ICAF) offer alternative formulations of analytic continued fractions, series, products and other infinite expansions, and the theory evolving from such compositions may shed light on the convergence/divergence of these expansions. Some functions can actually be expanded directly as infinite compositions. In addition, it is possible to use ICAF to evaluate solutions of fixed point equations involving infinite expansions. Complex dynamics offers another venue for iteration of systems of functions rather than a single function. For infinite compositions of a single function see Iterated function. For compositions of a finite number of functions, useful in fractal theory, see Iterated function system.

Although the title of this article specifies analytic functions, there are results for more general functions of a complex variable as well.

== Notation ==
There are several notations describing infinite compositions, including the following:

Forward compositions: $F_{k,n}(z) = f_k \circ f_{k + 1} \circ \dots \circ f_{n - 1} \circ f_n (z).$

Backward compositions: $G_{k,n}(z) = f_n \circ f_{n - 1} \circ \dots \circ f_{k + 1} \circ f_k (z).$

In each case convergence is interpreted as the existence of the following limits:

$$\lim_{n\to \infty} F_{1,n}(z), \qquad \lim_{n\to\infty} G_{1,n}(z).$$

For convenience, set F_{n}(z) = F_{1,n}(z) and G_{n}(z) = G_{1,n}(z).

One may also write $F_n(z)=\underset{k=1}{\overset{n}{\mathop R}}\,f_k(z)=f_1 \circ f_2\circ \cdots \circ f_n(z)$ and $G_n(z)=\underset{k=1}{\overset{n}{\mathop L}}\,g_k(z)=g_n \circ g_{n-1}\circ \cdots \circ g_1(z)$

Comment: It is not clear when the first explorations of infinite compositions of analytic functions not restricted to sequences of functions of a specific kind occurred. Possibly in the 1980s.

== Contraction theorem ==
Many results can be considered extensions of the following result:

Contraction Theorem for Analytic Functions—Let f be analytic in a simply-connected region S and continuous on the closure S̅ of S. Suppose f(S̅) is a bounded set contained in S. Then for all z in S̅ there exists an attractive fixed point α of f in S such that:
$$F_n(z)=(f\circ f\circ \cdots \circ f)(z)\to \alpha.$$

== Infinite compositions of contractive functions ==
Let {f_{n}} be a sequence of functions analytic on a simply-connected domain S. Suppose there exists a compact set Ω ⊂ S such that for each n, f_{n}(S) ⊂ Ω.

Forward (inner or right) Compositions Theorem—{F_{n}} converges uniformly on compact subsets of S to a constant function F(z) = λ.

Backward (outer or left) Compositions Theorem—{G_{n}} converges uniformly on compact subsets of S to γ ∈ Ω if and only if the sequence of fixed points {γ_{n}} of the {f_{n}} converges to γ.

Additional theory resulting from investigations based on these two theorems, particularly Forward Compositions Theorem, include location analysis for the limits obtained in the following reference. For a different approach to Backward Compositions Theorem, see the following reference.

Regarding Backward Compositions Theorem, the example f_{2n}(z) = 1/2 and f_{2n−1}(z) = −1/2 for S = {z : |z| < 1} demonstrates the inadequacy of simply requiring contraction into a compact subset, like Forward Compositions Theorem.

For functions not necessarily analytic the Lipschitz condition suffices:

Theorem—Suppose $S$ is a simply connected compact subset of $\Complex$ and let $t_n : S \to S$ be a family of functions that satisfies
$$\forall n, \forall z_1, z_2 \in S, \exists \rho: \quad \left|t_n(z_1)-t_n(z_2) \right|\le \rho |z_1-z_2|, \quad \rho < 1.$$
Define:
$$\begin{align}
G_n(z) &= \left (t_n\circ t_{n-1}\circ \cdots \circ t_1 \right ) (z) \\
F_n(z) &= \left (t_1 \circ t_2\circ \cdots \circ t_n \right ) (z)
\end{align}$$
Then $F_n(z)\to \beta \in S$ uniformly on $S.$ If $\alpha_n$ is the unique fixed point of $t_n$ then $G_n(z)\to \alpha$ uniformly on $S$ if and only if $|\alpha_n -\alpha| = \varepsilon_n \to 0$.

== Infinite compositions of other functions ==
=== Non-contractive complex functions ===
Results involving entire functions include the following, as examples. Set

$$\begin{align}
f_n(z)&=a_n z + c_{n,2}z^2+c_{n,3} z^3+\cdots \\
\rho_n &= \sup_r \left\{ \left| c_{n,r} \right|^{\frac{1}{r-1}} \right\}
\end{align}$$

Then the following results hold:

Theorem E1—If a_{n} ≡ 1,
$$\sum_{n=1}^\infty \rho_n < \infty$$
then F_{n} → F is entire.

Theorem E2—Set ε_{n} = |a_{n}−1| suppose there exists non-negative δ_{n}, M_{1}, M_{2}, R such that the following holds:
$$\begin{align}
\sum_{n=1}^\infty \varepsilon_n &< \infty, \\
\sum_{n=1}^\infty \delta_n &< \infty, \\
\prod_{n=1}^\infty (1+\delta_n) &< M_1, \\
\prod_{n=1}^\infty (1+\varepsilon_n) &< M_2, \\
\rho_n &< \frac{\delta_n}{R M_1 M_2}.
\end{align}$$
Then G_{n}(z) → G(z) is analytic for |z| < R. Convergence is uniform on compact subsets of {z : |z| < R}.

Additional elementary results include:

Theorem GF3—Suppose $f_k(z)=z+\rho_k \varphi_k (z)$ where there exist $R, M > 0$ such that $|z| < R$ implies $| \varphi_k (z)| < M, \forall k, \$ Furthermore, suppose $\rho_k \ge 0, \sum_{k=1}^\infty \rho_k < \infty$ and $R > M\sum_{k=1}^\infty \rho_k.$ Then for $R* < R-M\sum_{k=1}^\infty \rho_k$
$$G_n(z)\equiv \left (f_n\circ f_{n-1}\circ \cdots \circ f_1 \right ) (z) \to G(z) \qquad  \text{ for } \{z:|z|<R*\}$$

Theorem GF4—Suppose $f_k(z)=z+\rho_k \varphi_k (z)$ where there exist $R, M > 0$ such that $|z|<R$ and $|\zeta|<R$ implies $|\varphi_k (z)| < M$ and $|\varphi_k (z)-\varphi_k (\zeta)|\le r|z-\zeta|, \forall k. \$ Furthermore, suppose $\rho_k\ge 0, \sum_{k=1}^\infty \rho_k < \infty$ and $R>M \sum_{k=1}^\infty \rho_k.$ Then for $R* < R-M\sum_{k=1}^\infty\rho_k$
$$F_n(z)\equiv \left (f_1\circ f_2\circ \cdots \circ f_n \right) (z) \to F(z) \qquad \text{ for } \{z:|z|< R* \}$$

=== Linear fractional transformations ===
Results for compositions of linear fractional (Möbius) transformations include the following, as examples:

Theorem LFT1—On the set of convergence of a sequence {F_{n}} of non-singular LFTs, the limit function is either:

1. a non-singular LFT,
2. a function taking on two distinct values, or
3. a constant.

In (a), the sequence converges everywhere in the extended plane. In (b), the sequence converges either everywhere, and to the same value everywhere except at one point, or it converges at only two points. Case (c) can occur with every possible set of convergence.

Theorem LFT2—If {F_{n}} converges to an LFT, then f_{n} converge to the identity function f(z) = z.

Theorem LFT3—If f_{n} → f and all functions are hyperbolic or loxodromic Möbius transformations, then F_{n}(z) → λ, a constant, for all $z \ne \beta = \lim_{n\to \infty} \beta_n$, where {β_{n}} are the repulsive fixed points of the {f_{n}}.

Theorem LFT4—If f_{n} → f where f is parabolic with fixed point γ. Let the fixed-points of the {f_{n}} be {γ_{n}} and {β_{n}}. If
$$\sum_{n=1}^\infty \left|\gamma_n-\beta_n \right| < \infty \quad \text{and} \quad \sum_{n=1}^\infty n \left|\beta_{n+1}-\beta_n \right|<\infty$$
then F_{n}(z) → λ, a constant in the extended complex plane, for all z.

== Examples and applications ==
=== Continued fractions ===
The value of the infinite continued fraction

$$\cfrac{a_1}{b_1+\cfrac{a_2}{b_2+\cdots}}$$

may be expressed as the limit of the sequence {F_{n}(0)} where

$$f_n(z)=\frac{a_n}{b_n+z}.$$

As a simple example, a well-known result (Worpitsky's circle theorem) follows from an application of Theorem (A):

Consider the continued fraction

$$\cfrac{a_1\zeta }{1+\cfrac{a_2\zeta }{1+\cdots}}$$

with

$$f_n(z)=\frac{a_n \zeta }{1+z}.$$

Stipulate that |ζ| < 1 and |z| < R < 1. Then for 0 < r < 1,

$|a_n|<rR(1-R)\Rightarrow \left|f_n(z) \right|<rR<R\Rightarrow \frac{a_1\zeta }{1+\frac{a_2\zeta }{1+\cdots}} = F(\zeta)$, analytic for |z| < 1. Set R = 1/2.

Example. $F(z)=\frac{(i-1)z}{1+i+z\text{ }+}\text{ }\frac{(2-i)z}{1+2i+z\text{ }+}\text{ }\frac{(3-i)z}{1+3i+z\text{ }+} \cdots,$ $[-15,15]$

Example: Continued fraction1 – Topographical (moduli) image of a continued fraction (one for each point) in the complex plane. [−15,15]

Example. A fixed-point continued fraction form (a single variable).

$$f_{k,n}(z)=\frac{\alpha_{k,n} \beta_{k,n}}{\alpha_{k,n}+\beta_{k,n}-z}, \alpha_{k,n}=\alpha_{k,n}(z), \beta_{k,n}=\beta_{k,n}(z), F_n(z)= \left (f_{1,n} \circ\cdots \circ f_{n,n} \right ) (z)$$
$$\alpha_{k,n}=x \cos(ty)+iy \sin(tx), \beta_{k,n}= \cos(ty)+i \sin(tx), t=k/n$$

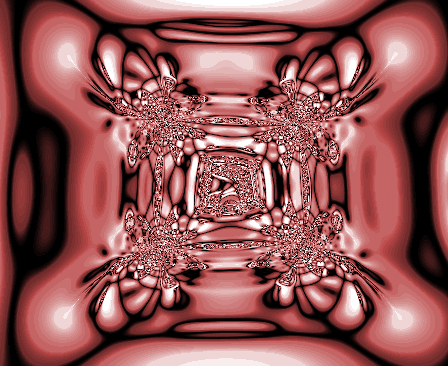
Example: Infinite Brooch - Topographical (moduli) image of a continued fraction form in the complex plane. (6<x<9.6),(4.8<y<8)

=== Direct functional expansion ===
Examples illustrating the conversion of a function directly into a composition follow:

Example 1. Suppose $\phi$ is an entire function satisfying the following conditions:

$$\begin{cases} \phi (tz)=t\left( \phi (z)+\phi (z)^2 \right) & |t|> 1 \\ \phi(0) = 0 \\ \phi'(0) =1 \end{cases}$$

Then

$$f_n(z)=z+\frac{z^2}{t^n}\Longrightarrow F_n(z)\to \phi (z)$$.

Example 2.

$$f_n(z)=z+\frac{z^2}{2^n}\Longrightarrow F_n(z)\to \frac{1}{2}\left( e^{2z}-1 \right)$$

Example 3.

$$f_n(z)= \frac{z}{1-\tfrac{z^2}{4^n}}\Longrightarrow F_n(z)\to \tan (z)$$

Example 4.

$$g_n(z)=\frac{2 \cdot 4^{n}}{z} \left ( \sqrt{1+\frac{z^2}{4^{n}}}-1 \right )\Longrightarrow G_n(z) \to \arctan (z)$$

=== Calculation of fixed-points ===
Theorem (B) can be applied to determine the fixed-points of functions defined by infinite expansions or certain integrals. The following examples illustrate the process:

Example FP1. For |ζ| ≤ 1 let

$$G(\zeta )=\frac{ \tfrac{e^\zeta}{4}}{3+\zeta +\cfrac{\tfrac{e^\zeta} 8 }{3+\zeta + \cfrac{\tfrac{e^\zeta}{12}}{3+\zeta +\cdots}}}$$

To find α = G(α), first we define:

$$\begin{align}
t_n(z)&=\cfrac{\tfrac{e^\zeta}{4n}}{3+\zeta +z} \\
f_n(\zeta )&= t_1\circ t_2\circ \cdots \circ t_n(0)
\end{align}$$

Then calculate $G_n(\zeta )=f_n\circ \cdots \circ f_1(\zeta )$ with ζ = 1, which gives: α = 0.087118118... to ten decimal places after ten iterations.

Theorem FP2—Let φ(ζ, t) be analytic in S = {z : |z| < R} for all t in [0, 1] and continuous in t. Set
$$f_n (\zeta)=\frac{1}{n} \sum_{k=1}^n \varphi \left( \zeta ,\tfrac{k}{n} \right).$$
If |φ(ζ, t)| ≤ r < R for ζ ∈ S and t ∈ [0, 1], then
$$\zeta =\int_0^1 \varphi (\zeta ,t) \, dt$$
has a unique solution, α in S, with $\lim_{n\to \infty} G_n(\zeta ) = \alpha.$

=== Evolution functions ===
Consider a time interval, normalized to I = [0, 1]. ICAFs can be constructed to describe continuous motion of a point, z, over the interval, but in such a way that at each "instant" the motion is virtually zero (see Zeno's Arrow): For the interval divided into n equal subintervals, 1 ≤ k ≤ n set $g_{k,n}(z)=z+\varphi_{k,n}(z)$ analytic or simply continuous – in a domain S, such that

$\lim_{n\to \infty}\varphi_{k,n}(z)=0$ for all k and all z in S,

and $g_{k,n}(z) \in S$.

==== Principal example ====
$$\begin{align}
g_{k,n}(z) &=z+\frac{1}{n}\phi  \left (z,\tfrac{k}{n} \right ) \\
G_{k,n}(z) &= \left (g_{k,n}\circ g_{k-1,n} \circ \cdots \circ g_{1,n} \right ) (z) \\
G_n(z) &=G_{n,n}(z)
\end{align}$$

implies

$$\lambda_n(z)\doteq G_n(z)-z=\frac{1}{n}\sum_{k=1}^n \phi  \left( G_{k-1,n}(z)\tfrac k n \right)\doteq \frac 1 n \sum_{k=1}^n \psi \left (z,\tfrac{k}{n} \right) \sim \int_0^1 \psi (z,t)\,dt,$$

where the integral is well-defined if $\tfrac{dz}{dt}=\phi (z,t)$ has a closed-form solution z(t). Then

$$\lambda_n(z_0)\approx \int_0^1 \phi ( z(t),t)\,dt.$$

Otherwise, the integrand is poorly defined although the value of the integral is easily computed. In this case one might call the integral a "virtual" integral.

Example. $\phi (z,t)=\frac{2t-\cos y}{1-\sin x\cos y}+i\frac{1-2t\sin x}{1-\sin x\cos y}, \int_0^1 \psi (z,t) \, dt$

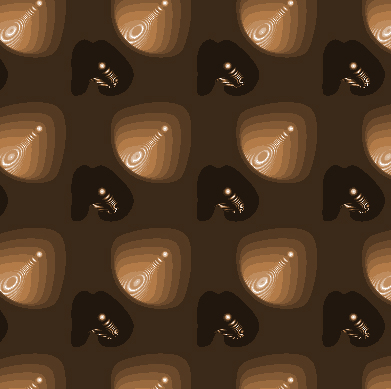
Example 1: Virtual tunnels – Topographical (moduli) image of virtual integrals (one for each point) in the complex plane. [−10,10]

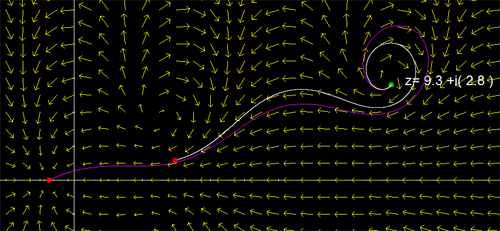
Two contours flowing towards an attractive fixed point (red on the left). The white contour (c = 2) terminates before reaching the fixed point. The second contour (c(n) = square root of n) terminates at the fixed point. For both contours, n = 10,000

Example. Let:

$$g_n(z)=z+\frac{c_n}{n}\phi  (z), \quad \text{with} \quad f(z) = z + \phi(z).$$

Next, set $T_{1,n}(z)=g_n(z), T_{k,n}(z)= g_n(T_{k-1,n}(z)),$ and T_{n}(z) = T_{n,n}(z). Let

$$T(z)=\lim_{n\to \infty} T_n(z)$$

when that limit exists. The sequence {T_{n}(z)} defines contours γ = γ(c_{n}, z) that follow the flow of the vector field f(z). If there exists an attractive fixed point α, meaning |f(z) − α| ≤ ρ|z − α| for 0 ≤ ρ < 1, then T_{n}(z) → T(z) ≡ α along γ = γ(c_{n}, z), provided (for example) $c_n = \sqrt{n}$. If c_{n} ≡ c > 0, then T_{n}(z) → T(z), a point on the contour γ = γ(c, z). It is easily seen that

$$\oint_\gamma \phi  (\zeta ) \, d\zeta =\lim_{n\to \infty}\frac c n \sum_{k=1}^n \phi ^2 \left (T_{k-1,n}(z) \right )$$

and

$$L(\gamma (z))=\lim_{n\to \infty} \frac{c}{n}\sum_{k=1}^n \left| \phi  \left (T_{k-1,n}(z) \right ) \right|,$$

when these limits exist.

These concepts are marginally related to active contour theory in image processing, and are simple generalizations of the Euler method

=== Self-replicating expansions ===
==== Series ====
The series defined recursively by f_{n}(z) = z + g_{n}(z) have the property that the nth term is predicated on the sum of the first n − 1 terms. In order to employ theorem (GF3) it is necessary to show boundedness in the following sense: If each f_{n} is defined for |z| < M then |G_{n}(z)| < M must follow before |f_{n}(z) − z| = |g_{n}(z)| ≤ Cβ_{n} is defined for iterative purposes. This is because $g_n(G_{n-1}(z))$ occurs throughout the expansion. The restriction

$$|z|<R=M-C\sum_{k=1}^\infty \beta_k >0$$

serves this purpose. Then G_{n}(z) → G(z) uniformly on the restricted domain.

Example (S1). Set

$$f_n(z)=z+\frac{1}{\rho n^2}\sqrt{z}, \qquad \rho >\sqrt{\frac{\pi}{6}}$$

and M = ρ^{2}. Then R = ρ^{2} − (π/6) > 0. Then, if $S=\left\{ z: |z|<R,\operatorname{Re}(z)>0 \right\}$, z in S implies |G_{n}(z)| < M and theorem (GF3) applies, so that

$$\begin{align}
G_n(z) &=z+g_1(z)+g_2(G_1(z))+g_3(G_2(z))+\cdots + g_n(G_{n-1}(z)) \\
&= z+\frac{1}{\rho \cdot 1^2}\sqrt{z}+\frac{1}{\rho \cdot 2^2}\sqrt{G_1(z)}+\frac{1}{\rho \cdot 3^2}\sqrt{G_2(z)}+\cdots +\frac{1}{\rho \cdot n^2} \sqrt{G_{n-1}(z)}
\end{align}$$

converges absolutely, hence is convergent.

Example (S2): $f_n(z)=z+\frac 1 {n^2}\cdot \varphi (z), \varphi (z)=2\cos(x/y)+i2\sin (x/y), >G_n(z)=f_n \circ f_{n-1}\circ \cdots \circ f_1(z), \qquad [-10,10], n=50$

Example (S2)- A topographical (moduli) image of a self generating series.

==== Products ====
The product defined recursively by

$$f_n(z)=z( 1+g_n(z)), \qquad |z| \leqslant M,$$

has the appearance

$$G_n(z) = z \prod _{k=1}^n \left( 1+g_k \left( G_{k-1}(z) \right) \right).$$

In order to apply Theorem GF3 it is required that:

$$\left| zg_n(z) \right|\le C\beta_n, \qquad \sum_{k=1}^\infty \beta_k<\infty.$$

Once again, a boundedness condition must support

$$\left|G_{n-1}(z) g_n(G_{n-1}(z))\right|\le C \beta_n.$$

If one knows Cβ_{n} in advance, the following will suffice:

$$|z| \leqslant R = \frac{M}{P} \qquad \text{where} \quad P = \prod_{n=1}^\infty \left( 1+C\beta_n\right).$$

Then G_{n}(z) → G(z) uniformly on the restricted domain.

Example (P1). Suppose $f_n(z)=z(1+g_n(z))$ with $g_n(z)=\tfrac{z^2}{n^3},$ observing after a few preliminary computations, that |z| ≤ 1/4 implies |G_{n}(z)| < 0.27. Then

$$\left|G_n(z)  \frac{G_n(z)^2}{n^3} \right|<(0.02)\frac{1}{n^3}=C\beta_n$$

and

$$G_n(z)=z \prod_{k=1}^{n-1}\left( 1+\frac{G_k(z)^2}{n^3}\right)$$

converges uniformly.

Example (P2).

$$g_{k,n}(z)=z\left( 1+\frac 1 n \varphi \left (z,\tfrac k n \right ) \right),$$
$$G_{n,n}(z)= \left( g_{n,n}\circ g_{n-1,n}\circ \cdots \circ g_{1,n} \right ) (z) = z\prod_{k=1}^n ( 1+P_{k,n}(z)),$$
$$P_{k,n}(z)=\frac 1 n \varphi \left (G_{k-1,n}(z),\tfrac{k}{n} \right ),$$
$$\prod_{k=1}^{n-1} \left( 1+P_{k,n}(z) \right) = 1+P_{1,n}(z)+P_{2,n}(z)+\cdots + P_{k-1,n}(z) + R_n(z) \sim \int_0^1 \pi (z,t) \, dt + 1+R_n(z),$$
$$\varphi (z)=x\cos(y)+iy\sin(x), \int_0^1 (z\pi (z,t)-1) \,dt, \qquad [-15,15]:$$

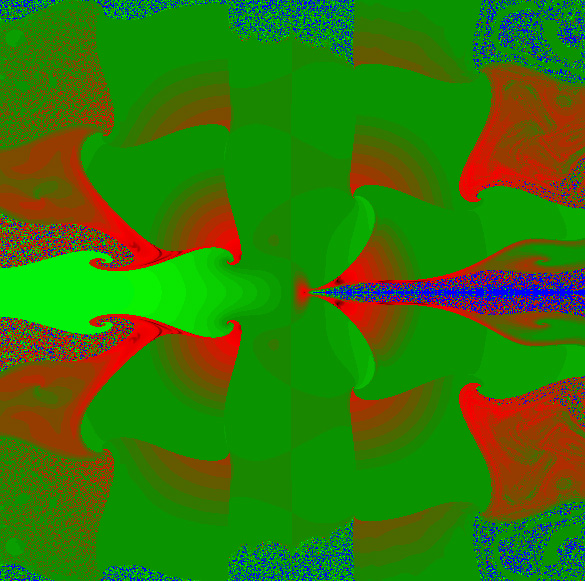
Example (P2): Picasso's Universe – a derived virtual integral from a self-generating infinite product. Click on image for higher resolution.

==== Continued fractions ====
Example (CF1): A self-generating continued fraction.

$$\begin{align}
F_n(z) &= \frac{\rho (z)}{\delta_1+} \frac{\rho (F_1(z))}{\delta_2 +} \frac{\rho (F_2(z))}{\delta_3+} \cdots \frac{\rho (F_{n-1}(z))}{\delta_n}, \\
\rho (z) &= \frac{\cos(y)}{\cos (y)+\sin (x)}+i\frac{\sin(x)}{\cos (y)+\sin (x)}, \qquad [0<x<20],[0<y<20], \qquad\delta_k\equiv 1
\end{align}$$

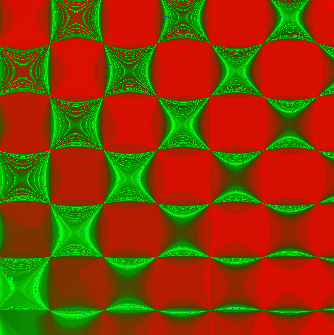
Example CF1: Diminishing returns – a topographical (moduli) image of a self-generating continued fraction.

Example (CF2): Best described as a self-generating reverse Euler continued fraction.

$$G_n(z)=\frac{\rho (G_{n-1}(z))}{1+\rho (G_{n-1}(z))-}\ \frac{\rho (G_{n-2}(z))}{1+\rho (G_{n-2}(z))-}\cdots \frac{\rho (G_1(z))}{1+\rho (G_1(z))-}\ \frac{\rho (z)}{1+\rho (z)-z},$$
$$\rho (z)=\rho (x+iy)=x\cos(y)+iy\sin(x), \qquad [-15,15], n=30$$

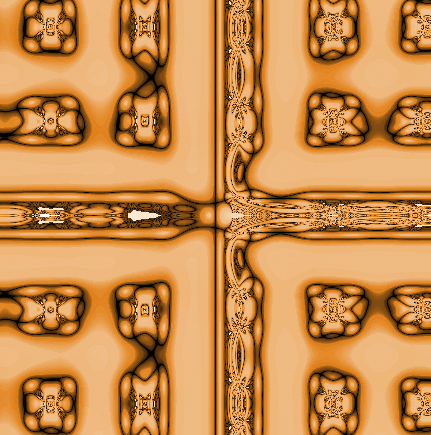
Example CF2: Dream of Gold – a topographical (moduli) image of a self-generating reverse Euler continued fraction.

== See also ==
- Generalized continued fraction
