= Abel equation =

Equation for function that computes iterated values

The Abel equation, named after Niels Henrik Abel, is a type of functional equation of the form

$$f(h(x)) = h(x + 1)$$

or

$$\alpha(f(x)) = \alpha(x)+1$$.

The forms are equivalent when α is invertible. h or α control the iteration of f.

== Equivalence ==
The second equation can be written

$$\alpha^{-1}(\alpha(f(x))) = \alpha^{-1}(\alpha(x)+1)\, .$$

Taking x = α^{−1}(y), the equation can be written

$$f(\alpha^{-1}(y)) = \alpha^{-1}(y+1)\, .$$

For a known function f(x) , a problem is to solve the functional equation for the function α^{−1} ≡ h, possibly satisfying additional requirements, such as α^{−1}(0) = 1.

The change of variables s^{α(x)} = Ψ(x), for a real parameter s, brings Abel's equation into the celebrated Schröder's equation, Ψ(f(x)) = s Ψ(x) .

The further change F(x) = exp(s^{α(x)}) into Böttcher's equation, F(f(x)) = F(x)^{s}.

The Abel equation is a special case of (and easily generalizes to) the translation equation,

$$\omega( \omega(x,u),v)=\omega(x,u+v) ~,$$

e.g., for $\omega(x,1) = f(x)$,

$\omega(x,u) = \alpha^{-1}(\alpha(x)+u)$. (Observe ω(x,0) = x.)

The Abel function α(x) further provides the canonical coordinate for Lie advective flows (one parameter Lie groups).

== History ==
Initially, the equation in the more general form was reported. Even in the case of a single variable, the equation is non-trivial, and admits special analysis.

In the case of a linear transfer function, the solution is expressible compactly.

== Special cases ==
The equation of tetration is a special case of Abel's equation, with f = exp.

In the case of an integer argument, the equation encodes a recurrent procedure, e.g.,

$$\alpha(f(f(x)))=\alpha(x)+2 ~,$$

and so on,

$$\alpha(f_n(x))=\alpha(x)+n ~.$$

== Solutions ==
The Abel equation has at least one solution on $E$ if and only if for all $x \in E$ and all $n \in \mathbb{N}^*$, $f^{n}(x) \neq x$, where $f^{n} = f \circ f \circ ... \circ f$, is the function f iterated n times.

We have the following existence and uniqueness theorem

Let $h: \R \to \R$ be analytic, meaning it has a Taylor expansion. To find: real analytic solutions $\alpha: \R \to \C$ of the Abel equation $\alpha \circ h = \alpha + 1$.

=== Existence ===
A real analytic solution $\alpha$ exists if and only if both of the following conditions hold:

- $h$ has no fixed points, meaning there is no $y \in \R$ such that $h(y) = y$.
- The set of critical points of $h$, where $h'(y) = 0$, is bounded above if $h(y) > y$ for all $y$, or bounded below if $h(y) < y$ for all $y$.

=== Uniqueness ===
The solution is essentially unique in the sense that there exists a canonical solution $\alpha_0$ with the following properties:

- The set of critical points of $\alpha_0$ is bounded above if $h(y) > y$ for all $y$, or bounded below if $h(y) < y$ for all $y$.
- This canonical solution generates all other solutions. Specifically, the set of all real analytic solutions is given by

$$\{\alpha_0 + \beta\circ \alpha_0 | \beta : \R \to \R \text{ is analytic, with period 1}\}.$$

=== Approximate solution ===
Analytic solutions (Fatou coordinates) can be approximated by asymptotic expansion of a function defined by power series in the sectors around a parabolic fixed point. The analytic solution is unique up to a constant.

== See also ==
- Functional equation
  - Schröder's equation
  - Böttcher's equation
- Infinite compositions of analytic functions
- Iterated function
- Shift operator
- Superfunction
