= Böttcher's equation =

Functional equation

Böttcher's equation, named after Lucjan Böttcher, is the functional equation

$$F(h(z)) = (F(z))^n$$

where

- h is a given analytic function with a superattracting fixed point of order n at a, (that is, $h(z)=a+c(z-a)^n+O((z-a)^{n+1}) ~,$ in a neighbourhood of a), with n ≥ 2
- F is a sought function.

The logarithm of this functional equation amounts to Schröder's equation.

== Solution ==
Solution of functional equation is a function in implicit form.

Lucian Emil Böttcher sketched a proof in 1904 on the existence of solution: an analytic function F in a neighborhood of the fixed point a, such that:

$$F(a)= 0$$

This solution is sometimes called:

- the Böttcher coordinate
- the Böttcher function
- the Boettcher map.

The complete proof was published by Joseph Ritt in 1920, who was unaware of the original formulation.

Böttcher's coordinate (the logarithm of the Schröder function) conjugates h(z) in a neighbourhood of the fixed point to the function z^{n}. An especially important case is when h(z) is a polynomial of degree n, and a = ∞ .

=== Explicit ===
One can explicitly compute Böttcher coordinates for:

- power maps $z\to z^d$
- Chebyshev polynomials

==== Examples ====
For the function h and n=2

$$h(x)=  \frac{x^2}{1 - 2x^2}$$

the Böttcher function F is:

$$F(x)=  \frac{x}{1 + x^2}$$

== Applications ==
Böttcher's equation plays a fundamental role in the part of holomorphic dynamics which studies iteration of polynomials of one complex variable.

Global properties of the Böttcher coordinate were studied by Fatou and Douady and Hubbard.

== See also ==
- Schröder's equation
- External ray
