= Schröder's equation =

Equation for fixed point of functional composition

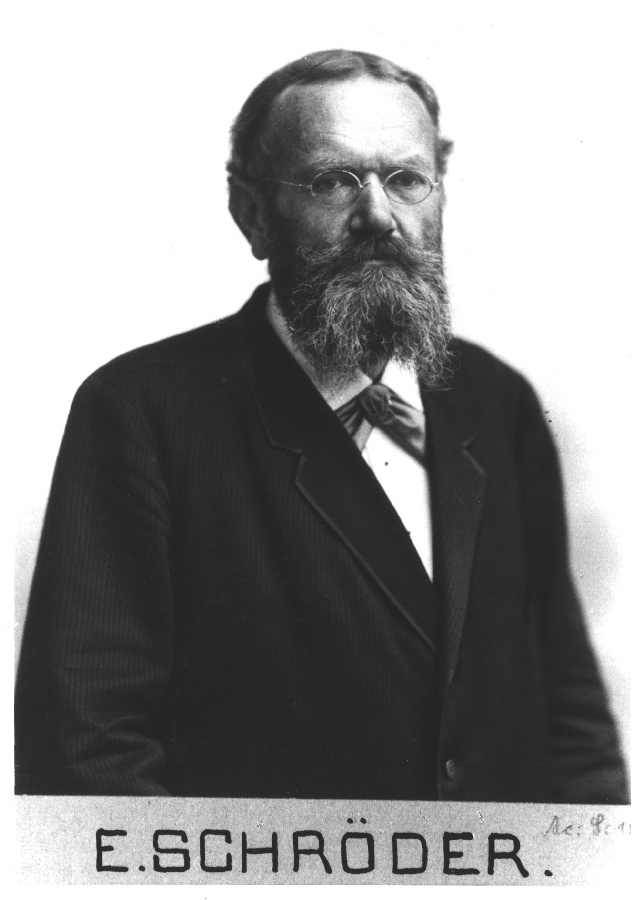
Ernst Schröder (1841–1902) in 1870 formulated his eponymous equation.

Schröder's equation, named after Ernst Schröder, is a functional equation with one independent variable: given the function h, find the function Ψ such that

$\forall x\;\;\;\Psi\big(h(x)\big) = s \Psi(x).$

Schröder's equation is an eigenvalue equation for the composition operator C_{h} that sends a function f to f(h(.)).

If a is a fixed point of h, meaning h(a) = a, then either Ψ(a) = 0 (or ∞) or s = 1. Application of the chain rule shows that the eigenvalue s is given by s = h′(a), provided that Ψ(a) is finite and Ψ′(a) does not vanish or diverge.

== Functional significance ==
For a = 0, if h is analytic on the unit disk, fixes 0, and 0 < |h′(0)| < 1, then Gabriel Koenigs showed in 1884 that there is an analytic (non-trivial) Ψ satisfying Schröder's equation. This is one of the first steps in a long line of theorems fruitful for understanding composition operators on analytic function spaces, cf. Koenigs function.

Equations such as Schröder's are suitable to encoding self-similarity, and have thus been extensively utilized in studies of nonlinear dynamics (often referred to colloquially as chaos theory). It is also used in studies of turbulence, as well as the renormalization group.

An equivalent transpose form of Schröder's equation for the inverse Φ = Ψ^{−1} of Schröder's conjugacy function is h(Φ(y)) = Φ(sy). The change of variables α(x) = log(Ψ(x))/log(s) (the Abel function) further converts Schröder's equation to the older Abel equation, α(h(x)) = α(x) + 1. Similarly, the change of variables Ψ(x) = log(φ(x)) converts Schröder's equation to Böttcher's equation, φ(h(x)) = (φ(x))^{s}.

Moreover, for the velocity, β(x) = Ψ/Ψ′, Julia's equation, β(f(x)) = f′(x)β(x), holds.

The n-th power of a solution of Schröder's equation provides a solution of Schröder's equation with eigenvalue s^{n}, instead. In the same vein, for an invertible solution Ψ(x) of Schröder's equation, the (non-invertible) function Ψ(x) k(log Ψ(x)) is also a solution, for any periodic function k(x) with period log(s). All solutions of Schröder's equation are related in this manner.

== Solutions ==
Schröder's equation was solved analytically if a is an attracting (but not superattracting) fixed point, that is 0 < |h′(a)| < 1 by Gabriel Koenigs (1884).

In the case of a superattracting fixed point, |h′(a)| = 0, Schröder's equation is unwieldy, and had best be transformed to Böttcher's equation.

There are a good number of particular solutions dating back to Schröder's original 1870 paper.

The series expansion around a fixed point and the relevant convergence properties of the solution for the resulting orbit and its analyticity properties are cogently summarized by Szekeres. Several of the solutions are furnished in terms of asymptotic series, cf. Jabotinsky matrix.

== Applications ==
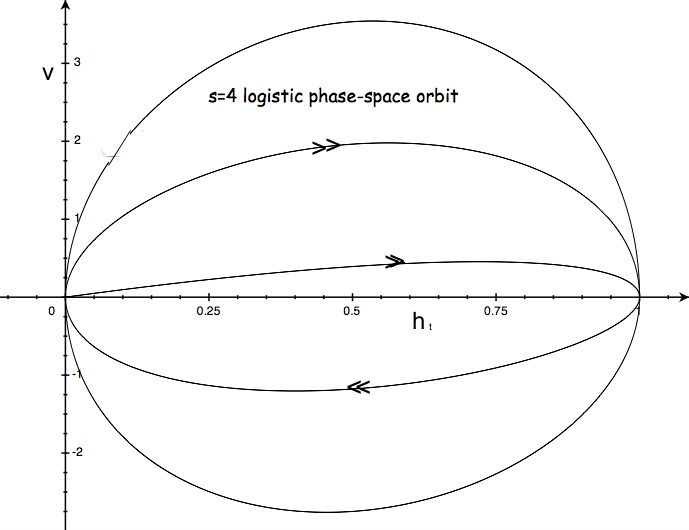
First five half periods of the phase-space orbit of the s = 4 chaotic logistic map h(x), interpolated holographically through Schröder's equation. The velocity v = dh_{t}/dt plotted against h_{t}. Chaos is evident in the orbit sweeping all xs at all times.

It is used to analyse discrete dynamical systems by finding a new coordinate system in which the system (orbit) generated by h(x) looks simpler, a mere dilation.

More specifically, a system for which a discrete unit time step amounts to x → h(x), can have its smooth orbit (or flow) reconstructed from the solution of the above Schröder's equation, its conjugacy equation.

That is, h(x) = Ψ^{−1}(s Ψ(x)) ≡ h_{1}(x).

In general, all of its functional iterates (its regular iteration group, see iterated function) are provided by the orbit

$h_t(x) = \Psi^{-1}\big(s^t \Psi(x)\big),$

for t real — not necessarily positive or integer. (Thus a full continuous group.) The set of h_{n}(x), i.e., of all positive integer iterates of h(x) (semigroup) is called the splinter (or Picard sequence) of h(x).

However, all iterates (fractional, infinitesimal, or negative) of h(x) are likewise specified through the coordinate transformation Ψ(x) determined to solve Schröder's equation: a holographic continuous interpolation of the initial discrete recursion x → h(x) has been constructed; in effect, the entire orbit.

For instance, the functional square root is h_{1/2}(x) = Ψ^{−1}(s^{1/2} Ψ(x)), so that h_{1/2}(h_{1/2}(x)) = h(x), and so on.

For example, special cases of the logistic map such as the chaotic case h(x) = 4x(1 − x) were already worked out by Schröder in his original article (p. 306),

Ψ(x) = (arcsin √x)^{2}, s = 4, and hence h_{t}(x) = sin^{2}(2^{t} arcsin √x).

In fact, this solution is seen to result as motion dictated by a sequence of switchback potentials, V(x) ∝ x(x − 1) (nπ + arcsin √x)^{2}, a generic feature of continuous iterates effected by Schröder's equation.

A nonchaotic case he also illustrated with his method, h(x) = 2x(1 − x), yields

Ψ(x) = −1/2ln(1 − 2x), and hence h_{t}(x) = −1/2((1 − 2x)^{2^{t}} − 1).

Likewise, for the Beverton–Holt model, h(x) = x/(2 − x), one readily finds Ψ(x) = x/(1 − x), so that

$$h_t(x)= \Psi^{-1}\big(2^{-t} \Psi(x)\big) = \frac{x}{2^t + x(1 - 2^t)}.$$

== See also ==
- Böttcher's equation
