= Ushiki's theorem =

In mathematics, particularly in the study of functions of several complex variables, Ushiki's theorem, named after S. Ushiki, states that certain well-behaved functions cannot have certain kinds of well-behaved invariant manifolds.

== The theorem ==
A biholomorphic mapping $F:\mathbb{C}^n\to\mathbb{C}^n$ cannot have a 1-dimensional compact smooth invariant manifold. In particular, such a map cannot have a homoclinic connection or heteroclinic connection.

== Commentary ==
Invariant manifolds typically appear as solutions of certain asymptotic problems in dynamical systems. The most common is the stable manifold or its kin, the unstable manifold.

== The publication ==
Ushiki's theorem was published in 1980. The theorem appeared in print again several years later, in a certain Russian journal, by an author apparently unaware of Ushiki's work.

== An application ==
The standard map cannot have a homoclinic or heteroclinic connection. The practical consequence is that one cannot show the existence of a Smale's horseshoe in this system by a perturbation method, starting from a homoclinic or heteroclinic connection. Nevertheless, one can show that Smale's horseshoe exists in the standard map for many parameter values, based on crude rigorous numerical calculations.

== See also ==
- Melnikov distance
- Equichordal point problem
