= Marina Ratner =

American mathematician (1938–2017)

Marina E. Ratner
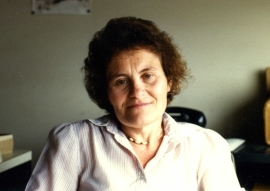
- Marina Ratner in 1988
- Born: October 30, 1938; Moscow, Russian SFSR
- Died: July 7, 2017 (aged 78); El Cerrito, California
- Education: Moscow State University
- Awards: Ostrowski Prize (1993)
- Scientific career
- Fields: Mathematics
- Workplaces: University of California, Berkeley
- Thesis: Geodesic Flows on Unit Tangent Bundles of Compact Surfaces of Negative Curvature (1969)
- Doctoral advisor: Yakov Sinai

Marina Evseevna Ratner (Russian: Мари́на Евсе́евна Ра́тнер; October 30, 1938 – July 7, 2017) was a professor of mathematics at the University of California, Berkeley who worked in ergodic theory. Around 1990, she proved a group of major theorems concerning unipotent flows on homogeneous spaces, known as Ratner's theorems. Ratner was elected to the American Academy of Arts and Sciences in 1992, awarded the Ostrowski Prize in 1993 and elected to the National Academy of Sciences the same year. In 1994, she was awarded the John J. Carty Award from the National Academy of Sciences.

== Early life ==
Ratner was born October 30, 1938, in Moscow, Russian SFSR. Her father was a plant physiologist and professor, and her mother was a chemist. Her family suffered from discrimination and antisemitism because they were Jewish. Ratner's mother was fired from work in the 1940s for writing to her mother in Israel, then considered an enemy of the Soviet state.

Ratner gained an interest in mathematics in her fifth grade. She was able to go to Moscow State University because the university had limited discrimination against Jewish applicants as the Khrushchev era began.

From 1956 to 1961, Ratner studied mathematics and physics at Moscow State University. Here, she became interested in probability theory, inspired by A.N. Kolmogorov and his group.

== Career ==
After graduation, Ratner spent four years working in Kolmogorov's applied statistics group. Following this, she returned to Moscow State university for graduate studies under Yakov G. Sinai, also a student of Kolmogorov. She completed her PhD thesis, titled "Geodesic Flows on Unit Tangent Bundles of Compact Surfaces of Negative Curvature", in 1969. During this time, Ratner studied the aforementioned geodesic flows as well as a special class of flows called Anosov flows. After earning her doctorate, she worked at the High Technical Engineering School in Moscow until she lost her job in 1970 due to applying for an emigration visa to Israel.

In 1971 Ratner emigrated from the Soviet Union to Israel and she taught at the Hebrew University of Jerusalem from 1971 until 1975. She continued to study geodesic flows, extending her results to higher dimensions. Ratner also proved that the trajectory of Anosov flows exhibited the Bernoulli property of randomness. She began to work with Rufus Bowen at Berkeley, who was studying similar Axiom A flows, and eventually was invited to join him as a professor in 1975. Ratner then emigrated to the United States and became a professor of mathematics at Berkeley, with "some controversy" following within the department. Ratner studied horocycle flows, proving that they are "loosely Bernoulli", and their Cartesian squares are not. In the early 1980s she described how rigidity applied to horocycle flows, and this led to her work on the Raghunathan conjecture.

During the 1980s Ratner published proofs of conjectures dealing with unipotent flows on quotients of Lie groups made by S. G. Dani and M. S. Raghunathan. During this time she proved a property now named after her, showing that two unipotent flow trajectories that remain together for a period of time will remain close for a much longer time.

In 1986, she boycotted the ICM hosted in Berkeley for its “de facto ‘female free’ policy.”

Much of Ratner's work focused on dynamical systems, especially over homogeneous spaces. Her results were abstract and had extensive consequences for different fields within math. In particular, a wide array of research in number theory has proceeded from her results.

== Personal life ==
Before earning her doctorate, Ratner had a daughter, Anna, from a brief marriage.

Ratner moved to Israel with her parents in the early 1970s. Her sister Judith remained in the Soviet Union, and lost her job as a research metallurgist in 1973 due to her family's emigration. When Ratner later moved to the U.S., her parents stayed in Israel. Judith applied to leave the Soviet Union in 1977 along with her husband, but they were denied permission and faced persecution because they were Jewish. Judith's family eventually received permission to leave in 1987.

Marina Ratner died July 7, 2017, at the age of 78.

== Honors and legacy ==
In 1992, Ratner was elected to the American Academy of Arts and Sciences, and in 1993, the National Academy of Sciences. Ratner also won the Ostrowski prize in 1993. For her theorems on unipotent flows and other work, she won the John J. Carty Award for the Advancement of Science in 1994. Also that year, she became the third woman plenary speaker at International Congress of Mathematicians, and Ingrid Daubechies followed her at the same conference. Emmy Noether and Karen Uhlenbeck had been the only other women to speak there for decades. Ratner's talk was titled Interactions between ergodic theory, Lie groups and number theory. In 2004, Ratner won the Donald Sterling Noyce Prize for Excellence in Undergraduate Teaching.

In 2013, Ratner received an honorary doctorate from the Hebrew University of Jerusalem, and they hosted a conference about her work.

Some mathematicians claim that Ratner would have won the Fields Medal, the most prestigious prize in mathematics, if her work had been completed by the age of 40, as required by the prize. Elon Lindenstrauss and Maryam Mirzakhani won the Fields Medal for work that grew out of Ratner's results. Her discoveries influenced many fields of mathematics, including geometry, dynamics, diophantine approximation, ergodic theory, and Lie group theory.

== Selected publications ==
- Ratner, Marina (1990). "Strict measure rigidity for unipotent subgroups of solvable groups". Inventiones Mathematicae. 101 (1): 449–482. Bibcode:1990InMat.101..449R. doi:10.1007/BF01231511. ISSN 0020-9910. S2CID 120179569.
- Ratner, Marina (1990). "On measure rigidity of unipotent subgroups of semisimple groups". Acta Mathematica. 165: 229–309. doi:10.1007/BF02391906. ISSN 0001-5962.
- Ratner, Marina (1995). "Interactions Between Ergodic Theory, Lie Groups, and Number Theory". Proceedings of the International Congress of Mathematicians. pp. 157–182. doi:10.1007/978-3-0348-9078-6_13. ISBN 978-3-0348-9897-3.
