= Alain Goriely =

Belgian mathematician

Alain Goriely FRS
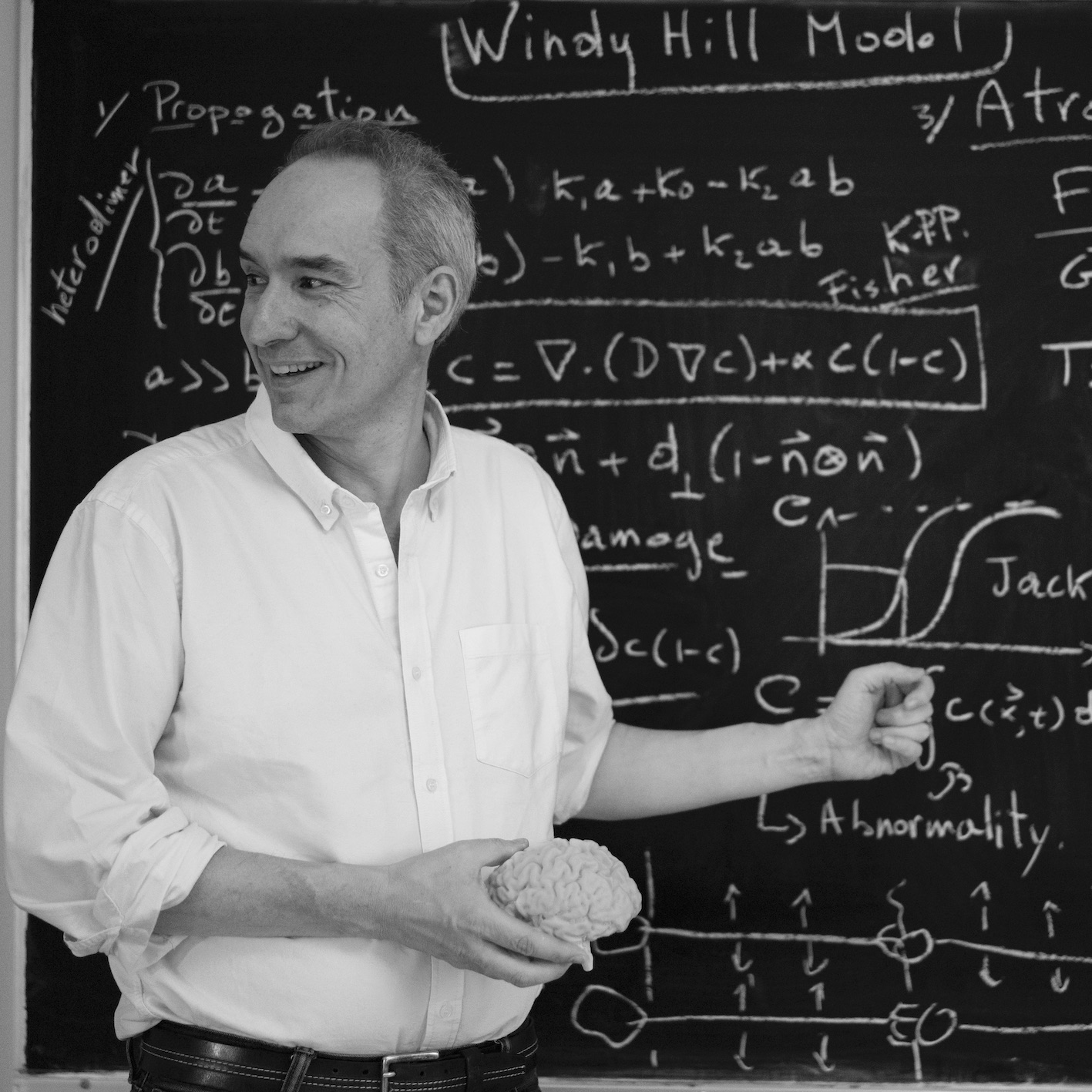
- Born: Brussels, Belgium
- Education: Université libre de Bruxelles (1989–94)
- Occupation: Mathematician
- Spouse: Nita Goriely
- Children: 3
- Awards: David Crighton Medal (2025); Engineering Medal from the Society of Engineering Science (2024); Cozzarelli Prize (US National Academy of Sciences) (2019); Fellow of the Society of Industrial and Applied Mathematics (2018); Royal Society Wolfson Research Merit Award (2010); Alfred P. Sloan Fellow (1999)
- Scientific career
- Fields: Applied Mathematics; Continuum mechanics; Mathematical and theoretical biology; Dynamical Systems
- Workplaces: University of Oxford; University of Arizona; Université libre de Bruxelles
- Thesis: Integrability and Nonintegrability of Dynamical Systems: A Singularity Analysis Approach.
- Doctoral advisor: Radu Bălescu
- Website: www.goriely.com

Alain Goriely FRS is a Belgian mathematician, currently holding the statutory professorship (chair) of mathematical modelling at the University of Oxford, Mathematical Institute. He is director of the Oxford Centre for Industrial Mathematics (OCIAM), of the International Brain and Mechanics Lab (IBMTL) and Professorial Fellow at St Catherine's College, Oxford. At the Mathematical Institute, he was the director of external relations and public engagement, from 2013 until 2022, initiating the Oxford Mathematics series of public lectures. In 2022, he was elected to the Royal Society, and Gresham Professor of Geometry at Gresham College (London) in 2024.

== Education and early life ==
Born and raised in Brussels, Goriely obtained his B.Sc. in 1989 and Ph.D. in 1994 from the Université libre de Bruxelles where he became a lecturer in the Mathematics Department. Shortly after, he moved to the University of Arizona to take the positions of Research Associate (1994–1997), Assistant Professor (1998–2002), Associate Professor (2002–2007) and Professor (2007–2010). In Tucson, he also served as acting head for the Program in Applied Mathematics in 2006–2007 and 2007–2008. In 2010, he moved to Oxford to take up the inaugural chair of Mathematical Modelling and to become Director of the Oxford Centre for Collaborative Applied Mathematics (OCCAM). He is a Senior Fellow of the Oxford Martin School and received an M.A. in 2010 from the University of Oxford (by resolution). He has held a number of positions, including visiting professorships at the École Polytechnique Fédérale de Lausanne, the École normale supérieure (Paris), and the Pierre and Marie Curie University. He also held the Timoshenko professorial fellowship and the Poincaré visiting professorship at Stanford University, the Springer professorship at the University of California, Berkeley and the Distinguished Rothschild Visiting Fellowship at the Isaac Newton Institute.

== Research and career ==
Goriely works in the field of applied mathematics and he is interested in a broad range of problems including dynamical systems; the mechanics of biological growth; the modelling of the brain, the theoretical foundations of mechanics; the dynamics of curves, knots, and rods; the modelling of cancer; the development of new photovoltaic devices; the modelling of lithium-ion batteries and, more generally the study and development of mathematical methods for applied sciences.

=== Differential equations and dynamical systems ===
In his doctoral research on singularities, integrability theory, and dynamical systems, he established deep connections between the analytic and geometric approaches of differential equations by showing that the local behavior of the solutions of differential equations in complex time is connected to their global geometric properties in phase space. In particular, he developed new tests to prove the integrability and non-integrability for systems of differential equations and discrete mappings, based on the so-called Painlevé expansions in complex time. More importantly, he derived a new form of the Melnikov distance from the local Painlevé property that can be used to prove the existence of transverse homoclinic connections, thereby directly relating local multivaluedness in complex time to chaotic dynamics in real-time. He also gave sufficient conditions for the existence of open sets of initial conditions leading to finite-time singularities which cosmologists use to explore possible singularities in cosmological models (such as the expanding general-relativistic Friedmann universe, brane singularity). These results are summarized in his monograph.

=== Curves and filaments ===
Over the years, Goriely has worked on the modeling and analysis of filaments. Elastic curves can be modeled through the Kirchhoff equations, which take into account bending, shearing, and extension. In 1998, he identified an instability driven by curvature and showed that a torsional instability of filaments under tension can result in structures with opposite chirality, for which he coined the term tendril perversion. His work in this area has also addressed static and dynamical solutions of Kirchhoff elastic rods, stability methods based on the second variation, the nonlinear dynamics of elastic tubes conveying fluid, plant twining and tropism, wave propagation in nonlinear rods, bacterial curvature, stem growth, seed expulsion, protein mechanics, and growing and remodeling elastic rods. With colleagues, he used this framework to develop models of plant tropism involving multiple stimuli.

=== Morphoelasticity ===
Goriely has worked in the applications of nonlinear mechanics to the field of biological materials and biological growth. Through his work, he was central in the development of a general mechanical theory of biological growth. This theory, for which he coined the word morphoelasticity, deals with the physical forces and shapes generated during development, homeostasis, or pathology. At the mathematical level, it is based on the general theory of nonlinear anelasticity. While the basic theoretical framework was understood as early as 1994, in 2005 Martine Ben Amar developed a general stability method for morphoelastic solids and demonstrated that patterns and instabilities can be driven exclusively through growth. He further expanded this aspect of his research to demonstrate the occurrence of growth-induced patterns in many biological and physiological systems such as fungi, bacteria, and microbial cellular blebbing. Together with Derek Moulton and Régis Chirat, he developed a theory to describe morphological patterns for seashells, such as spikes and commarginal ornamentation. His theory of morphoelasticity is developed in his 2017 monograph on growth.

=== Mathematical foundations of mechanics ===
Goriely made several contributions to the foundations of classical mechanics and nonlinear elasticity. With his collaborators, he has given a general exact theory of Euler buckling within three-dimensional nonlinear elasticity, developed new fundamental adscititious inequalities for materials exhibiting the negative Poynting effect, and studied the nonlinear dynamics of shear waves in elastic solids. Since 2012, he has initiated, with Arash Yavari, a research programme related to the geometric foundations of mechanics for nonlinear solids. In the absence of defects, solids can be described through the mapping of a reference configuration in Euclidean space to a current configuration that also sits in Euclidean space. In the presence of defects, the correct underlying mathematical structure that describes the reference configuration is a non-Euclidean manifold. These ideas, first presented in the work of Kazuo Kondo in the 1940s, were known to the mechanics community but had never been used directly to build an effective theory of continuous defects. In this fully geometric theory, first described in their 2012 paper, they show that pure dislocations, disclinations, and point defects are, respectively, associated with Weitzenbock, Riemann, and Weyl manifolds. Further, they used Cartan's moving frames theory to formulate a complete theory of defects which can be used to obtain exact solutions for a number of important problems in nonlinear dislocation theory and anelasticity. They used this theory to obtain the exact nonlinear analogue of Eshelby's celebrated inclusion problem for a spherical inclusion in an isotropic incompressible nonlinear solid. They also introduced the concept of discombinations to describe sources of incompatibility related to multiple origins (point, lines, and edge defects).

=== Energy and materials ===
Goriely has done work in the field of materials science and renewable energy, ionic liquids, nano-particles fabrication, supercapacitors, and lithium-ion batteries. In 2013, he initiated a collaboration with Henry Snaith on the development of a new generation of perovskite solar cell. In their 2014 paper, they developed a mathematical model to predict coverage and morphology during the annealing of a thin solid film of a perovskite absorber. This model predicts the optimum film thickness and annealing temperature ensuring that it has exactly the right degree of transparency.

=== Brain modeling ===
Since 2012, Goriely has done some work related to brain modeling. With his collaborators, he has developed models for axon growth based on the combined mechanics of microtubule extension and growth cone connection. At the tissue level, with his collaborators, he developed new constitutive models for brain tissue validated on multi-axial shear experiments using human brain tissues. This work forms the basis for his models of swelling initiation and propagation showing that the Donnan effect is not sufficient and that swelling is also caused by an osmotic pressure increase driven by non-permeating solutes released by necrotic cells. At the organ level, he proposed the first mechanical models of craniectomy and craniosynostosis through systematic mathematical modeling, analysis and computational simulations in fully segmented brain geometry, and explained the thickness asymmetry between gyri and sulci first noted more than 100 years ago by Brodmann. More recently, they developed a model for dementia propagation and showed that atrophy could be modeled through a multiplicative decomposition of the deformation gradient coupling mass removal to toxic proteins and studied the related cognitive decay.

=== Publications ===
Goriely is the author of three books

- Goriely A. Integrability and nonintegrability of dynamical systems. World Scientific; 2001.
- Goriely A. The mathematics and mechanics of biological growth. Springer; 2017
- Goriely A. Applied Mathematics: A very short introduction. Oxford University Press; 2017
