= Melnikov distance =

In mathematics, the Melnikov method is a tool to identify the existence of chaos in a class of dynamical systems under periodic perturbation.

== Background ==
The Melnikov method is used in many cases to predict the occurrence of chaotic orbits in non-autonomous smooth nonlinear systems under periodic perturbation. According to the method, it is possible to construct a function called the "Melnikov function" which can be used to predict either regular or chaotic behavior of a dynamical system. Thus, the Melnikov function will be used to determine a measure of distance between stable and unstable manifolds in the Poincaré map. Moreover, when this measure is equal to zero, by the method, those manifolds crossed each other transversally and from that crossing the system will become chaotic.

This method appeared in 1890 by H. Poincaré and by V. Melnikov in 1963 and could be called the "Poincaré-Melnikov Method". Moreover, it was described by several textbooks as Guckenheimer & Holmes, Kuznetsov, S. Wiggins, Awrejcewicz & Holicke and others. There are many applications for Melnikov distance as it can be used to predict chaotic vibrations. In this method, critical amplitude is found by setting the distance between homoclinic orbits and stable manifolds equal to zero. Just like in Guckenheimer & Holmes where they were the first who based on the KAM theorem, determined a set of parameters of relatively weak perturbed Hamiltonian systems of two-degrees-of-freedom, at which homoclinic bifurcation occurred.

== The Melnikov distance ==
Consider the following class of systems given by

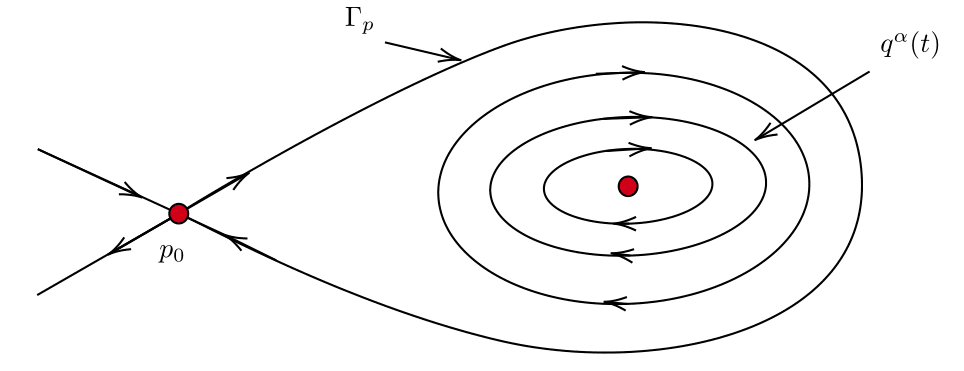
Figure 1: Phase space representing the assumptions $A1$ and $A2$ with respect to the system (1).

$${{ \begin{array}{lcl} \dot{x} &=& \frac{\partial H}{\partial y}(x,y) + \epsilon g_{1}(x,y,t,\epsilon) \\ \dot{y} &=& -\frac{\partial H}{\partial x}(x,y) + \epsilon g_{2}(x,y,t,\epsilon),\end{array}{{(1)}}}}$$
or in vector form
$${{\dot{q} = J DH(q) + \epsilon g(q,t,\epsilon)~\ ~\     {{(2)}}}}$$

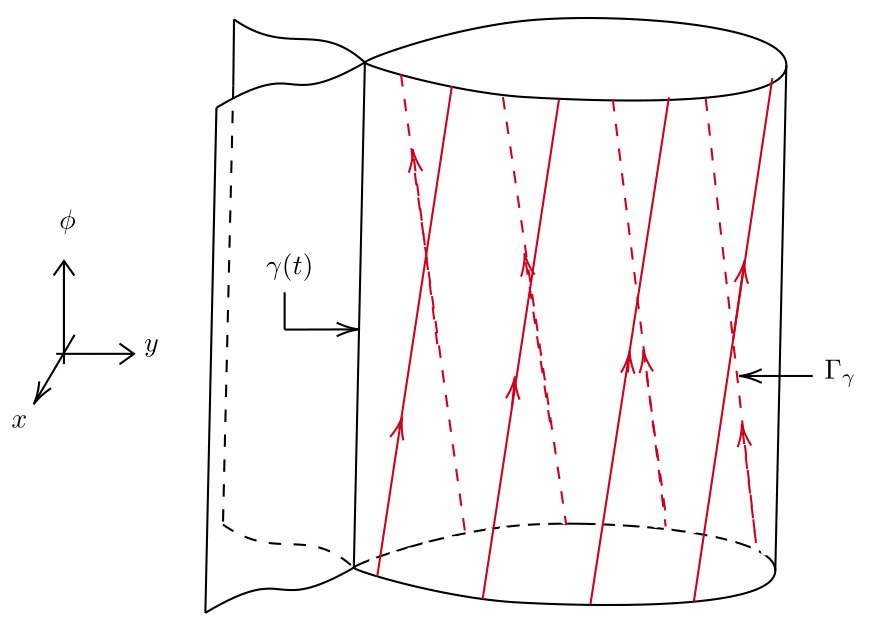
Figure 2: Homoclinic manifolds $W^{s}(\gamma (t))$ and $W^{u}(\gamma (t))$indicated by $\Gamma_{\gamma}.$ The lines on $\Gamma_{\gamma}$ represent a typical trajectory of the system 4.

where $q=(x,y)$, $DH = \left(\frac{\partial H}{\partial x},\frac{\partial H}{\partial y}\right)$, $g=(g_{1},g_{2})$ and

$J = \left( \begin{array}{cc} 0 & 1 \\ -1 & 0 \\ \end{array} \right).$

Assume that system (1) is smooth on the region of interest, $\epsilon$ is a small perturbation parameter and $g$ is a periodic vector function in $t$with the period $T = \dfrac{2 \pi}{\omega}$.

If $\epsilon = 0$, then there is an unperturbed system

${\dot{q} = J DH(q). ~\ ~\ {(3)}}$

From this system (3), looking at the phase space in Figure 1, consider the following assumptions

- A1 - The system has a hyperbolic fixed point $p_0$, connected to itself by a homoclinic orbit $q_{0}(t) = (x_{0}(t),y_{0}(t));$
- A2 - The system is filled inside $\Gamma_{p_{0}}$by a continuous family of periodic orbits $q^{\alpha}(t)$ of period $T^{\alpha}$with $\alpha \in (-1, 0),$ where $\Gamma_{p_{0}} = \{q \in \mathbb{R}^{2}|q=q_{0}(t), t \in \mathbb{R}\} = W^{s}(p_{0}) \cap W^{u}(p_{0}) \cup \{p_{0}\}.$

To obtain the Melnikov function, some tricks have to be used, for example, to get rid of the time dependence and to gain geometrical advantages new coordinate has to be used $\phi$ that is cyclic type given by $\phi = \omega t + \phi_{0}.$Then, the system (1) could be rewritten in vector form as follows

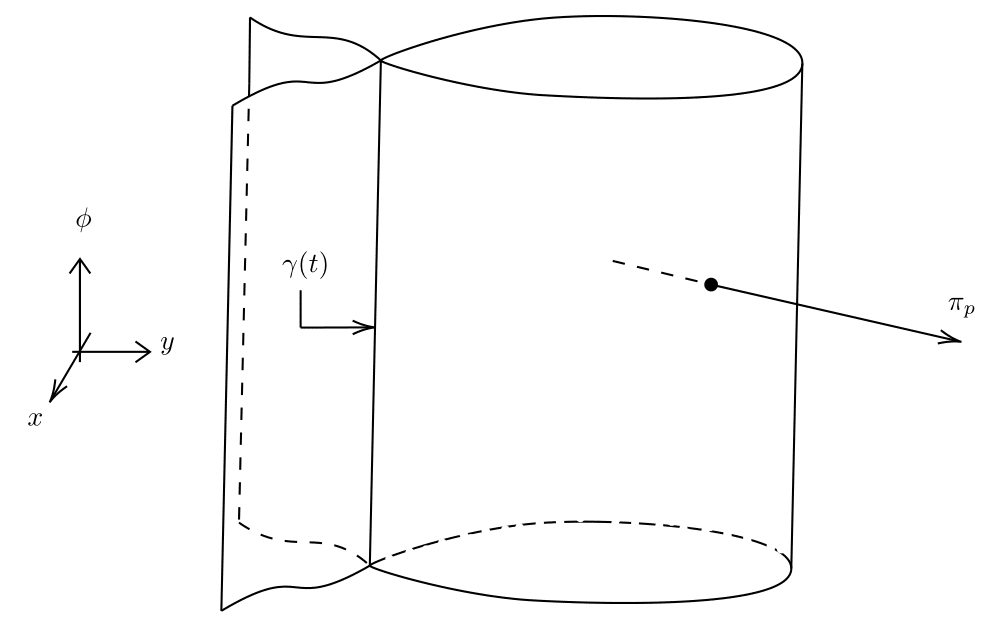
Figure 3: Normal vector $\pi_{p}$to $\Gamma_{\gamma}$.

${{ \begin{array}{lcl} \dot{q} &=& J DH(q) + \epsilon g(q,\phi,\epsilon) \\ \dot{\phi} &=& \omega.\end{array} ~\ ~\ {{(4)}}}}$

Hence, looking at Figure 2, the three-dimensional phase space $\mathbb{R}^{2} \times \mathbb{S}^{1},$where $q \in \mathbb{R}^{2}$and $\phi \in \mathbb{S}^{1}$has the hyperbolic fixed point $p_{0}$of the unperturbed system becoming a periodic orbit $\gamma(t) = (p_{0}, \phi(t)).$ The two-dimensional stable and unstable manifolds of $\gamma (t)$by $W^{s}(\gamma (t))$and $W^{u}(\gamma (t))$ are denoted, respectively. By the assumption $A1,$ $W^{s}(\gamma (t))$ and $W^{u}(\gamma (t))$coincide along a two-dimensional homoclinic manifold. This is denoted by $\Gamma_{\gamma} = \{(q,\phi)\in \mathbb{R}^{2} \times \mathbb{S}^{1}|q=q_{0}(-t_{0}), t_{0} \in \mathbb{R}; \phi= \phi_{0} \in (0, 2\pi]\},$where $t_0$ is the time of flight from a point $q_{0}(-t_{0})$to the point $q_{0}(0)$on the homoclinic connection.

In the Figure 3, for any point $p \equiv (q_{0}(-t_{0}), \phi_{0}),$ a vector is constructed $\pi_{p}$, normal to the $\Gamma_{\gamma}$as follows $\pi_{p} \equiv (DH(q_{0}(-t_{0}),0).$Thus varying $t_0$and $\phi_0$serve to move $\pi_{p}$to every point on $\Gamma_{\gamma}.$

== Splitting of stable and unstable manifolds ==
If $\epsilon \neq 0$ is sufficiently small, which is the system (2), then $\gamma(t)$ becomes $\gamma_{\epsilon}(t),$ $\Gamma_{\gamma}$ becomes $\Gamma_{\gamma_{\epsilon}},$ and the stable and unstable manifolds become different from each other. Furthermore, for this sufficiently small $\epsilon$in a neighborhood $\mathcal{N}(\epsilon_{0}),$ the periodic orbit $\gamma(t)$of the unperturbed vector field (3) persists as a periodic orbit, $\gamma_{\epsilon}(t) = \gamma(t) + \mathcal{O}(\epsilon).$ Moreover, $W^{s}_{loc}(\gamma_{\epsilon}(t))$ and $W^{u}_{loc}(\gamma_{\epsilon}(t))$ are $C^{r}$ $\epsilon$-close to $W^{s}_{loc}(\gamma(t))$ and $W^{u}_{loc}(\gamma(t))$ respectively.

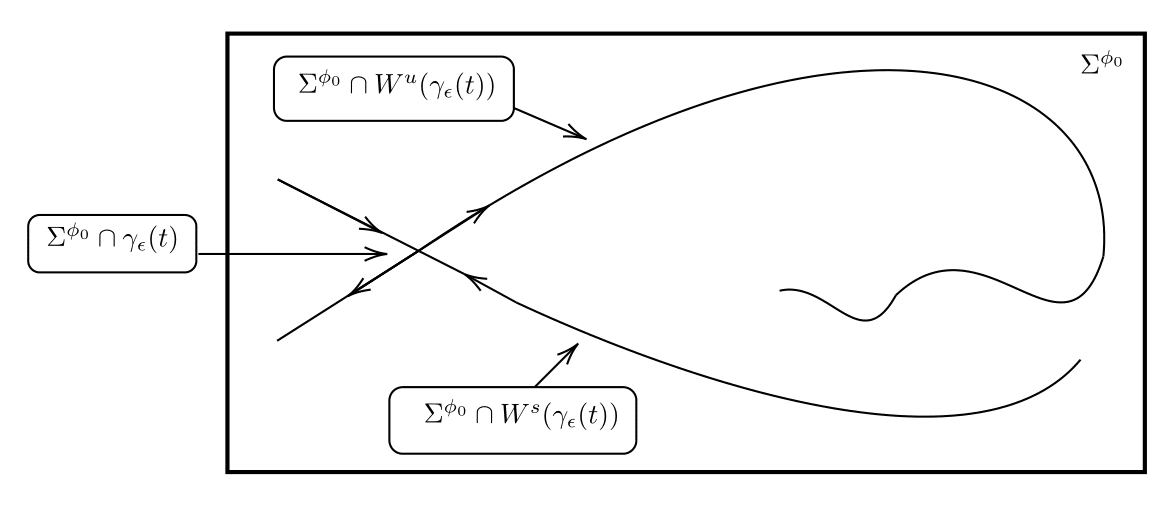
Figure 4: Splitting of the manifolds giving $W^{s}(\gamma_{\epsilon}(t))$ and $W^{u}(\gamma_{\epsilon}(t))$ as projections in $\Sigma^{\phi_0}.$

Consider the following cross-section of the phase space $\Sigma^{\phi_0} = \{ (q,\phi) \in \mathbb{R}^{2}| \phi = \phi_0 \},$ then $(q(t),\phi(t))$ and $(q_{\epsilon}(t),\phi(t))$ are the trajectories of the

unperturbed and perturbed vector fields, respectively. The projections of these trajectories onto $\Sigma^{\phi_0}$are given by $(q(t),\phi_{0}(t))$ and $(q_{\epsilon}(t),\phi_{0}(t)).$ Looking at the Figure 4, splitting of $W^{s}(\gamma_{\epsilon}(t))$ and $W^{u}(\gamma_{\epsilon}(t)),$ is defined hence, consider the points that intersect $\pi_{p}$ transversely as $p^{s}_{\epsilon}$ and $p^{u}_{\epsilon}$, respectively. Therefore, it is natural to define the distance between $W^{s}(\gamma_{\epsilon}(t))$ and $W^{u}(\gamma_{\epsilon}(t))$ at the point $p,$ denoted by $d(p,\epsilon) \equiv |p^{s}_{\epsilon} - p^{u}_{\epsilon}|$and it can be rewritten as $d(p,\epsilon) = \dfrac{(p^{s}_{\epsilon} - p^{u}_{\epsilon}) \cdot (DH(q_{0}(-t_{0}),0)}{\parallel(DH(q_{0}(-t_{0}),0)\parallel }.$ Since $p^{s}_{\epsilon}$and $p^{u}_{\epsilon}$lie on $\pi_{p}, p^{s}_{\epsilon} = (q_{\epsilon}^{s},\phi_0)$and $p^{u}_{\epsilon} = (q_{\epsilon}^{u},\phi_0),$ and then $d(p,\epsilon)$ can be rewritten by

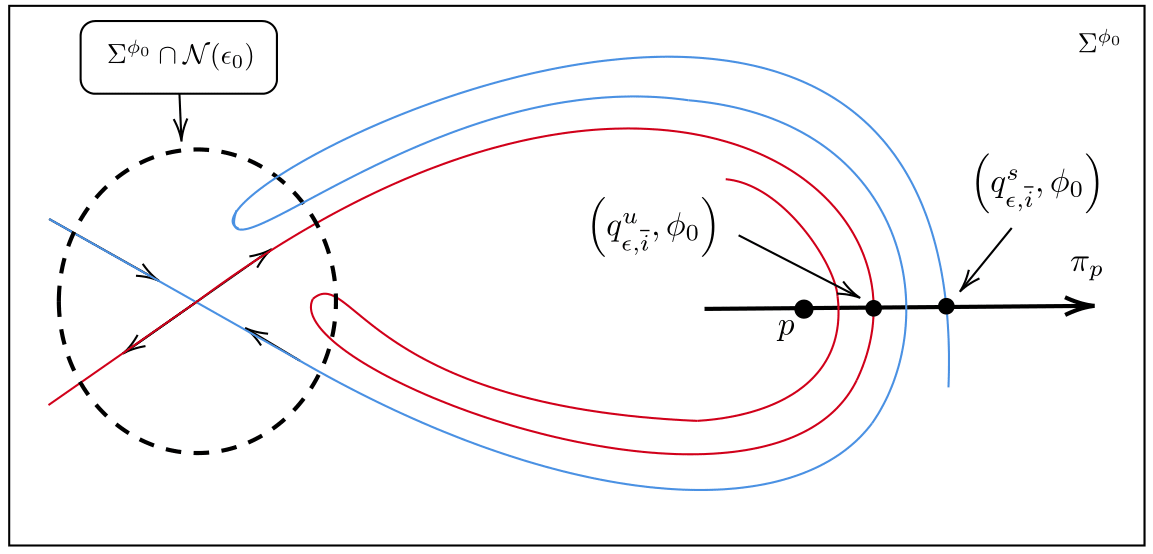
Figure 5: Geometrical representation with respect to the crossing of the manifolds to the normal vector $\pi_{p}.$

${{ d(t_{0}, \phi_{0}, \epsilon) = \dfrac{DH(q_{0}(-t_{0})) \cdot (q_{\epsilon}^{u}-q_{\epsilon}^{s})}{\parallel(DH(q_{0}(-t_{0})) \parallel}. ~\ ~\ {{(5)}}}}$

The manifolds $W^{s}(\gamma_{\epsilon}(t))$ and $W^{u}(\gamma_{\epsilon}(t))$ may intersect $\pi_{p}$ in more than one point as shown in Figure 5. For it to be possible, after every intersection, for $\epsilon$ sufficiently small, the trajectory must pass through $\mathcal{N}(\epsilon_{0})$ again.

== Deduction of the Melnikov function ==
Expanding in Taylor series the eq. (5) about $\epsilon = 0,$ gives us $d(t_{0},\phi_{0},\epsilon) = d(t_{0},\phi_{0},0) + \epsilon \frac{\partial d}{\partial \epsilon}(t_{0},\phi_{0},0) + \mathcal{O}(\epsilon^{2}),$ where $d(t_{0},\phi_{0},0)=0$ and $\frac{\partial d}{\partial \epsilon}(t_{0},\phi_{0},0) = \dfrac{DH(q_{0}(-t_{0})) \cdot \left(\frac{\partial q_{\epsilon}^{u}}{\partial \epsilon}\Big |_{\epsilon=0} -\frac{\partial q_{\epsilon}^{s}}{\partial \epsilon}\Big |_{\epsilon=0}\right) }{\parallel(DH(q_{0}(-t_{0}))\parallel }.$

When $d(t_{0},\phi_{0},\epsilon) = 0,$ then the Melnikov function is defined to be

${{M(t_{0},\phi_0) \equiv DH(q_{0}(-t_{0})) \cdot \left(\frac{\partial q_{\epsilon}^{u}}{\partial \epsilon}\Big |_{\epsilon=0} -\frac{\partial q_{\epsilon}^{s}}{\partial \epsilon} \Big |_{\epsilon=0}\right), ~\ ~\ {{(6)}}}}$

since $DH(q_{0}(-t_{0})) = \left( \dfrac{\partial H}{\partial x}(q_{0}(-t_{0})), \dfrac{\partial H}{\partial y}(q_{0}(-t_{0}))\right)$is not zero on $q_{0}(-t_{0})$, considering $t_0$finite and $M(t_{0},\phi_0) = 0 \Rightarrow \dfrac{\partial d}{\partial \epsilon} (t_{0},\phi_{0}) = 0.$

Using eq. (6) it will require knowing the solution to the perturbed problem. To avoid this, Melnikov defined a time dependent Melnikov function

${{M(t;t_{0},\phi_0) \equiv DH(q_{0}(t-t_{0})) \cdot \left(\frac{\partial q_{\epsilon}^{u}(t)}{\partial \epsilon}\Big |_{\epsilon=0} -\frac{\partial q_{\epsilon}^{s}(t)}{\partial \epsilon} \Big |_{\epsilon=0}\right) ~\ ~\ {{(7)}}}}$

Where $q_\epsilon^u(t)$ and $q_\epsilon^s(t)$ are the trajectories starting at $q_\epsilon^u$ and $q_\epsilon^s$ respectively. Taking the time-derivative of this function allows for some simplifications. The time-derivative of one of the terms in eq. (7) is
$${{\dfrac{d}{dt} \left(DH(q_{0}(t-t_{0})) \cdot
\frac{\partial q_{\epsilon}^{u,s}(t)}{\partial \epsilon}\Big |_{\epsilon=0}
\right)
=
\left(D^2H(q_{0}(t-t_{0})\dot{q_0}(t-t_0))\right) \cdot
\frac{\partial q_{\epsilon}^{u,s}(t)}{\partial \epsilon}\Big |_{\epsilon=0}
+
DH(q_{0}(t-t_{0})) \cdot
\dfrac{d}{dt}\frac{\partial q_{\epsilon}^{u,s}(t)}{\partial \epsilon}\Big |_{\epsilon=0}
. ~\ ~\     {{(8)}}}}$$
From the equation of motion, $\dot{q}_{\epsilon}^{u,s}(t) = JDH(q_{\epsilon}^{u,s}(t)) + \epsilon g(q_{\epsilon}^{u,s}(t),t,\epsilon),$ then
$${{\dfrac{d}{dt}\frac{\partial q_{\epsilon}^{u,s}}{\partial \epsilon}\Big |_{\epsilon=0}
= JD^2H(q_0(t-t_0))\dfrac{\partial q_{\epsilon}^{u,s}}{\partial\epsilon}\Big |_{\epsilon=0}
+ g(q_0(t-t_0),t,0) ~\ ~\     {{(9)}}}}$$
Plugging equations (2) and (9) back into (8) gives
$${{\begin{align}{ll} \dfrac{d}{dt} \left(DH(q_{0}(t-t_{0})) \cdot
\dfrac{\partial q_{\epsilon}^{u,s}}{\partial \epsilon}\Big |_{\epsilon=0}
\right)
=&
D^2H(q_{0}(t-t_{0}))JDH(q_0(t-t_0) \cdot
\dfrac{\partial q_{\epsilon}^{u,s}(t)}{\partial \epsilon}\Big |_{\epsilon=0}
\\&+
\ DH(q_{0}(t-t_{0})) \cdot
JD^2H(q_0(t-t_0))\dfrac{\partial q_{\epsilon}^{u,s}(t)}{\partial\epsilon}\Big |_{\epsilon=0}
\\&+
\ DH(q_{0}(t-t_{0})) \cdot
g(q_0(t-t_0),\phi(t),0)\end{align} ~\ ~\     {{(10)}}}}$$
The first two terms on the right hand side can be verified to cancel by explicitly evaluating the matrix multiplications and dot products. $g(q,t,\epsilon)$ has been reparameterized to $g(q,\phi,\epsilon)$.

Integrating the remaining term, the expression for the original terms does not depend on the solution of the perturbed problem.

${{\begin{array}{lcl}DH(q_{0}(\tau-t_{0})) \cdot \dfrac{\partial q_{\epsilon}^{u}(\tau)}{\partial \epsilon}\Big |_{\epsilon=0} & = \displaystyle \int_{-\infty}^{\tau} DH(q_{0}(t-t_{0})) \cdot g(q_0(t-t_0),\omega t+\phi_0,0) dt \\ DH(q_{0}(\tau-t_{0})) \cdot \dfrac{\partial q_{\epsilon}^{s}(\tau)}{\partial \epsilon}\Big |_{\epsilon=0} & = \displaystyle \int_{\infty}^{\tau} DH(q_{0}(t-t_{0})) \cdot g(q_0(t-t_0),\omega t+\phi_0,0) dt \end{array} ~\ ~\ {{(11)}}}}$

The lower integration bound has been chosen to be the time where $q_{\epsilon}^{u,s}(t) = \gamma(t)$, so that $\frac{\partial q_{\epsilon}^{u,s}(t)}{\partial\epsilon} = 0$ and therefore the boundary terms are zero.

Combining these terms and setting $\tau=0,$ the final form for the Melnikov distance is obtained by

${{M(t_{0},\phi_0) = \int_{-\infty}^{+\infty} DH(q_{0}(t)) \cdot g(q_{0}(t), \omega t + \omega t_0 + \phi_0, 0) dt. ~\ ~\ {{(12)}}}}$

Then, using this equation, the following theorem

Theorem 1: Suppose there is a point $(t_0, \phi_0) = (\bar{t_0},\bar{\phi_0})$such that

- i) $M(\bar{t_0},\bar{\phi_0}) = 0$ and
- ii) $\left.\frac{\partial M}{\partial t_0}\right|_{(\bar{t_0},\bar{\phi_0})} \neq 0$.

Then, for $\epsilon$ sufficiently small, $W^{s}(\gamma_{\epsilon}(t))$ and $W^{u}(\gamma_{\epsilon}(t))$ intersect transversely at $(q_{0}(-t_0) + \mathcal{O}(\epsilon), \phi_0).$ Moreover, if $M(t_{0},\phi_0) \neq 0$ for all $(t_{0},\phi_0) \in \mathbb{R}^{1} \times \mathbb{S}^{1}$, then $W^{s}(\gamma_{\epsilon}(t)) \cap W^{u}(\gamma_{\epsilon}(t)) = \emptyset.$

== Simple zeros of the Melnikov function imply chaos ==
From Theorem 1 when there is a simple zero of the Melnikov function implies in transversal intersections of the stable $W^{s}(\gamma_{\epsilon}(t))$and $W^{u}(\gamma_{\epsilon}(t))$ manifolds that results in a homoclinic tangle. Such tangle is a very complicated structure with the stable and unstable manifolds intersecting an infinite number of times.

Consider a small element of phase volume, departing from the neighborhood of a point near the transversal intersection, along the unstable manifold of a fixed point. Clearly, when this volume element approaches the hyperbolic fixed point it will be distorted considerably, due to the repetitive infinite intersections and stretching (and folding) associated with the relevant invariant sets. Therefore, it is reasonably expect that the volume element will undergo an infinite sequence of stretch and fold transformations as the horseshoe map. Then, this intuitive expectation is rigorously confirmed by a theorem stated as follows

Theorem 2: Suppose that a diffeomorphism $P : M \rightarrow M$, where $M$ is an n-dimensional manifold, has a hyperbolic fixed point $\bar{x}$ with a stable $W^{s}(\bar{x})$ and $W^{u}(\bar{x})$ unstable manifold that intersect transversely at some point $x_0 \neq \bar{x}$, $W^{s}(\bar{x}) \perp W^{u}(\bar{x}),$where $dimW^{s} + dimW^{u}=n.$ Then, $M$ contains a hyperbolic set $\Lambda$, invariant under $P$, on which $P$ is topologically conjugate to a shift on finitely many symbols.

Thus, according to the Theorem 2, it implies that the dynamics with a transverse homoclinic point is topologically similar to the horseshoe map and it has the property of sensitivity to initial conditions and hence when the Melnikov distance (10) has a simple zero, it implies that the system is chaotic.
