= Symbolic dynamics =

Modeling a dynamical system's states as infinite sequences of symbols

In mathematics, symbolic dynamics is the study of dynamical systems defined on a discrete space consisting of infinite sequences of abstract symbols. The evolution of the dynamical system is defined as a simple shift of the sequence.

Because of their explicit, discrete nature, such systems are often relatively easy to characterize and understand. They form a key tool for studying topological or smooth dynamical systems, because in many important cases it is possible to reduce the dynamics of a more general dynamical system to a symbolic system. To do so, a Markov partition is used to provide a finite cover for the smooth system; each set of the cover is associated with a single symbol, and the sequences of symbols result as a trajectory of the system moves from one covering set to another.

== History ==
The idea goes back to Jacques Hadamard's 1898 paper on the geodesics on surfaces of negative curvature. It was applied by Marston Morse in 1921 to the construction of a nonperiodic recurrent geodesic. Related work was done by Emil Artin in 1924 (for the system now called Artin billiard), Pekka Myrberg, Paul Koebe, Jakob Nielsen, G. A. Hedlund.

The first formal treatment was developed by Morse and Hedlund in their 1938 paper. George Birkhoff, Norman Levinson and the pair Mary Cartwright and J. E. Littlewood have applied similar methods to qualitative analysis of nonautonomous second order differential equations.

Claude Shannon used symbolic sequences and shifts of finite type in his 1948 paper A mathematical theory of communication that gave birth to information theory.

During the late 1960s the method of symbolic dynamics was developed to hyperbolic toral automorphisms by Roy Adler and Benjamin Weiss, and to Anosov diffeomorphisms by Yakov Sinai who used the symbolic model to construct Gibbs measures. In the early 1970s the theory was extended to Anosov flows by Marina Ratner, and to Axiom A diffeomorphisms and flows by Rufus Bowen.

A spectacular application of the methods of symbolic dynamics is Sharkovskii's theorem about periodic orbits of a continuous map of an interval into itself (1964).

== Examples ==
Consider the set of two-sided infinite sequences on two symbols, 0 and 1. A typical element in this set looks like: (..., 0, 1, 0, 0, 1, 0, 1, ... )

There will be exactly two fixed points under the shift map: the sequence of all zeroes, and the sequence of all ones. A periodic sequence will have a periodic orbit. For instance, the sequence (..., 0, 1, 0, 1, 0, 1, 0, 1, ...) will have period two.

More complex concepts such as heteroclinic orbits and homoclinic orbits also have simple descriptions in this system. For example, any sequence that has only a finite number of ones will have a homoclinic orbit, tending to the sequence of all zeros in forward and backward iterations.

=== Itinerary ===
Itinerary of point with respect to the partition is a sequence of symbols. It describes dynamic of the point.

== Applications ==
Symbolic dynamics originated as a method to study general dynamical systems; now its techniques and ideas have found significant applications in data storage and transmission, linear algebra, the motions of the planets and many other areas. The distinct feature in symbolic dynamics is that time is measured in discrete intervals. So at each time interval the system is in a particular state. Each state is associated with a symbol and the evolution of the system is described by an infinite sequence of symbols—represented effectively as strings. If the system states are not inherently discrete, then the state vector must be discretized, so as to get a coarse-grained description of the system.

== See also ==
- Measure-preserving dynamical system
- Combinatorics and dynamical systems
- Shift space
- Shift of finite type
- Complex dynamics
- Arithmetic dynamics
