= Artin billiard =

Type of a dynamical billiard first studied by Emil Artin in 1924

In mathematics and physics, the Artin billiard is a type of a dynamical billiard first studied by Emil Artin in 1924. It describes the geodesic motion of a free particle on the non-compact Riemann surface $\mathbb{H}/\Gamma,$ where $\mathbb{H}$ is the upper half-plane endowed with the Poincaré metric and $\Gamma=PSL(2,\mathbb{Z})$ is the modular group. It can be viewed as the motion on the fundamental domain of the modular group with the sides identified.

The system is notable in that it is an exactly solvable system that is strongly chaotic: it is not only ergodic, but is also strong mixing. As such, it is an example of an Anosov flow. Artin's paper used symbolic dynamics for analysis of the system.

The quantum mechanical version of Artin's billiard is also exactly solvable. The eigenvalue spectrum consists of a bound state and a continuous spectrum above the energy $E=1/4$. The wave functions are given by Bessel functions.

== Exposition ==
The motion studied is that of a free particle sliding frictionlessly, namely, one having the Hamiltonian

$$H(p,q)=\frac{1}{2m} p_i p_j g^{ij}(q)$$

where m is the mass of the particle, $q^i, i=1,2$ are the coordinates on the manifold, $p_i$ are the conjugate momenta:

$$p_i=mg_{ij} \frac{dq^j}{dt}$$

and

$$ds^2=g_{ij}(q) \, dq^i \, dq^j$$

is the metric tensor on the manifold. Because this is the free-particle Hamiltonian, the solution to the Hamilton-Jacobi equations of motion are simply given by the geodesics on the manifold.

In the case of the Artin billiards, the metric is given by the canonical Poincaré metric

$$ds^2=\frac{dy^2}{y^2}$$

on the upper half-plane. The non-compact Riemann surface $\mathcal{H}/\Gamma$ is a symmetric space, and is defined as the quotient of the upper half-plane modulo the action of the elements of $PSL(2,\mathbb{Z})$ acting as Möbius transformations. The set

$$U = \left\{ z \in H: \left| z \right| > 1,\, \left| \,\mbox{Re}(z) \,\right| < \frac{1}{2} \right\}$$

is a fundamental domain for this action.

The manifold has, of course, one cusp. This is the same manifold, when taken as the complex manifold, that is the space on which elliptic curves and modular functions are studied.
