= Asok Ray =

Mathematician, mechanical engineer and professor

Asok Ray is a mechanical engineer, an applied mathematician, and a Distinguished Professor of Mechanical Engineering and Mathematics at the Pennsylvania State University. He has published in numerous academic and scientific journals. His contributions to the fields of signal processing, machine learning, and estimation were focused on anomaly detection and statistical pattern recognition based on the theories of symbolic dynamics, and statistical mechanics.
