= Equichordal point problem =

Resolved problem in plane geometry

In Euclidean plane geometry, the equichordal point problem is the question whether a closed planar convex body can have two equichordal points. The problem was originally posed in 1916 by Fujiwara and in 1917 by Wilhelm Blaschke, Hermann Rothe, and Roland Weitzenböck. A generalization of this problem statement was answered in the negative in 1997 by Marek R. Rychlik.

== Problem statement ==
An equichordal curve is a closed planar curve for which a point in the plane exists such that all chords passing through this point are equal in length. Such a point is called an equichordal point. It is easy to construct equichordal curves with a single equichordal point, particularly when the curves are symmetric; the simplest construction is a circle.

It has long only been conjectured that no convex equichordal curve with two equichordal points can exist. More generally, it was asked whether there exists a Jordan curve $C$ with two equichordal points $O_1$ and $O_2$, such that the curve $C$ would be star-shaped with respect to each of the two points.

== Excentricity (or eccentricity) ==
Many results on equichordal curves refer to their excentricity. It turns out that the smaller the excentricity, the harder it is to disprove the existence of curves with two equichordal points. It can be shown rigorously that a small excentricity means that the curve must be close to the circle.

Let $C$ be the hypothetical convex curve with two equichordal points $O_1$ and $O_2$. Let $L$ be the common length of all chords of the curve $C$ passing through $O_1$ or $O_2$. Then excentricity is the ratio

$$a = \frac{\|O_1-O_2\|}{L}$$

where $\|O_1-O_2\|$ is the distance between the points $O_1$ and $O_2$.

== The history of the problem ==
The problem has been extensively studied, with significant papers published over eight decades preceding its solution:

1. In 1916, Fujiwara proved that no convex curves with three equichordal points exist.
2. In 1917, Blaschke, Rothe and Weitzenböck formulated the problem again.
3. In 1923, Süss showed certain symmetries and uniqueness of the curve, if it existed.
4. In 1953, G. A. Dirac showed some explicit bounds on the curve, if it existed.
5. In 1958, Wirsing showed that the curve, if it exists, must be an analytic curve. In this deep paper, he correctly identified the problem as perturbation problem beyond all orders.
6. In 1966, Ehrhart proved that there are no equichordal curves with excentricities > 0.5.
7. In 1974, Hallstrom gave a condition on the curve, if it exists, that shows it must be unique, analytic, symmetric and provides a means (given enough computer power) to demonstrate non-existence for any specific eccentricity.
8. In 1988, Michelacci proved that there are no equichordal curves with excentricities > 0.33. The proof is mildly computer-assisted.
9. In 1992, Schäfke and Volkmer showed that there is at most a finite number of values of excentricity for which the curve may exist. They outlined a feasible strategy for a computer-assisted proof. Their method consists of obtaining extremely accurate approximations to the hypothetical curve.
10. In 1996, Rychlik fully solved the problem.

== Rychlik's proof ==
Marek Rychlik's proof was published in the hard to read article. There is also an easy to read, freely available on-line, research announcement article, but it only hints at the ideas used in the proof.

The proof does not use a computer. Instead, it introduces a complexification of the original problem, and develops a generalization of the theory of normally hyperbolic invariant curves and stable manifolds to multi-valued maps $F:\mathbb{C}^2\to\mathbb{C}^2$. This method allows the use of global methods of complex analysis. The prototypical global theorem is the Liouville's theorem. Another global theorem is Chow's theorem. The global method was used in the proof of Ushiki's Theorem.

== See also ==
Similar problems and their generalizations have also been studied.

1. The equireciprocal point problem
2. The general chordal problem of Gardner
3. Equiproduct point problem
