= Arthur Dacres =

English physician and academic (1624–1678)

Arthur Dacres (1624–1678) was an English physician and academic, briefly Gresham Professor of Geometry.

== Life ==
He was sixth son of Sir Thomas Dacres, knight, of Cheshunt, and was born in that parish, where he was baptised on 18 April 1624. He entered Magdalene College, Cambridge, in December 1642, and graduated B.A. in 1645. He was elected a fellow of his college on 22 July 1646, and took the degree of M.D. on 28 July 1654.

He settled in London and was elected a fellow of the College of Physicians on 26 June 1665, and assistant-physician to Sir John Micklethwaite at St. Bartholomew's Hospital on the resignation of Dr. Christopher Terne, 13 May 1653. On 20 May 1664 he was appointed professor of geometry at Gresham College, but only held office for ten months. He was censor at the College of Physicians in 1672, and died in September 1678, being still assistant-physician at St. Bartholomew's.
