= Markov partition =

A Markov partition in mathematics is a tool used in dynamical systems theory, allowing the methods of symbolic dynamics to be applied to the study of hyperbolic dynamics. By using a Markov partition, the system can be made to resemble a discrete-time Markov process, with the long-term dynamical characteristics of the system represented as a Markov shift. The appellation 'Markov' is appropriate because the resulting dynamics of the system obeys the Markov property. The Markov partition thus allows standard techniques from symbolic dynamics to be applied, including the computation of expectation values, correlations, topological entropy, topological zeta functions, Fredholm determinants and the like.

== Motivation ==
Let $(M, \varphi)$ be a discrete dynamical system. A basic method of studying its dynamics is to find a symbolic representation: a faithful encoding of the points of $M$ by sequences of symbols such that the map $\varphi$ becomes the shift map.

Suppose that $M$ has been divided into a number of pieces $E_1, E_2, \ldots, E_r$ which are thought to be as small and localized, with virtually no overlaps. The behavior of a point $x$ under the iterates of $\varphi$ can be tracked by recording, for each $n$, the part $E_i$ which contains $\varphi^n (x)$. This results in an infinite sequence on the alphabet $\{1, 2, \ldots, r\}$ which encodes the point. In general, this encoding may be imprecise (the same sequence may represent many different points) and the set of sequences which arise in this way may be difficult to describe. Under certain conditions, which are made explicit in the rigorous definition of a Markov partition, the assignment of the sequence to a point of $M$ becomes an almost one-to-one map whose image is a symbolic dynamical system of a special kind called a shift of finite type. In this case, the symbolic representation is a powerful tool for investigating the properties of the dynamical system $(M, \varphi)$.

== Formal definition ==
A Markov partition is a finite cover of the invariant set of the manifold by a set of curvilinear rectangles $\{E_1, E_2, \ldots, E_r\}$ such that

- For any pair of points $x,y\in E_i$, that $W_s(x)\cap W_u(y) \in E_i$
- $\operatorname{Int} E_i \cap \operatorname{Int} E_j=\emptyset$ for $i\ne j$
- If $x\in \operatorname{Int} E_i$ and $\varphi(x)\in \operatorname{Int} E_j$, then

$$\varphi\left[W_u(x)\cap E_i\right] \supset W_u(\varphi x) \cap E_j$$

$$\varphi\left[W_s(x)\cap E_i\right] \subset W_s(\varphi x) \cap E_j$$

Here, $W_u(x)$ and $W_s(x)$ are the unstable and stable manifolds of x, respectively, and $\operatorname{Int} E_i$ simply denotes the interior of $E_i$.

These last two conditions can be understood as a statement of the Markov property for the symbolic dynamics; that is, the movement of a trajectory from one open cover to the next is determined only by the most recent cover, and not the history of the system. It is this property of the covering that merits the 'Markov' appellation. The resulting dynamics is that of a Markov shift; that this is indeed the case is due to theorems by Yakov Sinai (1968) and Rufus Bowen (1975), thus putting symbolic dynamics on a firm footing.

Variants of the definition are found, corresponding to conditions on the geometry of the pieces $E_i$.

== Examples ==
Markov partitions have been constructed in several situations.

- Anosov diffeomorphisms of the torus.
- Dynamical billiards, in which case the covering is countable.

Markov partitions make homoclinic and heteroclinic orbits particularly easy to describe.

The system $([0,1), x \mapsto 2x\ mod\ 1)$ has the Markov partition $E_0 = (0,1/2), E_1 = (1/2,1)$, and in this case the symbolic representation of a real number in $[0,1)$ is its binary expansion. For example: $x \in E_0, Tx \in E_1, T^2x \in E_1, T^3x \in E_1, T^4x \in E_0 \Rightarrow x = (0.01110...)_2$. The assignment of points of $[0,1)$ to their sequences in the Markov partition is well defined except on the dyadic rationals - morally speaking, this is because $(0.01111\dots)_2 = (0.10000\dots)_2$, in the same way as $1 = 0.999\dots$ in decimal expansions.
