= Ralph Button =

Ralph Button (died 1680) was an English academic and clergyman, Gresham Professor of Geometry, canon of Christ Church, Oxford under the Commonwealth, and later a nonconformist schoolmaster.

== Life ==
He was the son of Robert Button of Bishopstone, Wiltshire, and was educated at Exeter College, Oxford. He proceeded B.A. in 1630; in 1633 the Rector of Exeter, John Prideaux, recommended him to Sir Nathaniel Brent, the Warden of Merton College, for a fellowship in his college. The fellowship was conferred on him, and he became known in the university as a successful tutor. Among his pupils were Zachary Bogan, Anthony à Wood, and John Murcot.

On the outbreak of the First English Civil War in 1642, Button, who sympathised with the parliamentarians, moved to London, and on 15 November 1643 was elected Professor of Geometry at Gresham College, in the place of John Greaves. In 1647 he was nominated a delegate to aid the parliamentary visitors at Oxford in their work of reform, and apparently resumed his tutorship at Merton. On 18 February. 1648 Button was appointed by the visitors junior proctor; on 11 April he pronounced a Latin oration before Philip Herbert, 4th Earl of Pembroke, the new chancellor of the university, and on 13 June he resigned his Gresham professorship. On 4 August he was made canon of Christ Church and public orator of the university, in the place of Henry Hammond, who had been removed by the parliamentary commission. At the same time Button declined to supplicate for the degree of D.D. on the ground of the expense; Wood says that he had then lately married.

Button showed independence in successfully resisting the endeavour of the visitors to expel Edward Pocock from the Hebrew and Arabic lectureship on the ground of political disaffection. At the Restoration Button was ejected from all his offices and his place at Christ Church was taken by John Fell. Leaving Oxford, he went to Brentford, where he kept a school; he taught alongside Thomas Pakeman who was his neighbour. Richard Baxter says that he was soon afterwards imprisoned for six months for teaching and not having taken the Oxford oath. At the date of the Declaration of Indulgence (1672) Button moved to Islington, and Joseph Jekyll lived with him as his pupil. He died at Islington in October 1680, and was buried in the parish church. A son died and was buried at the same time. Baxter in Reliquiae Baxterianae speaks highly of him. He left a daughter, who married Dr. Boteler of London.
