= Gresham Professor of Geometry =

Title held by eminent maths professors at Gresham College

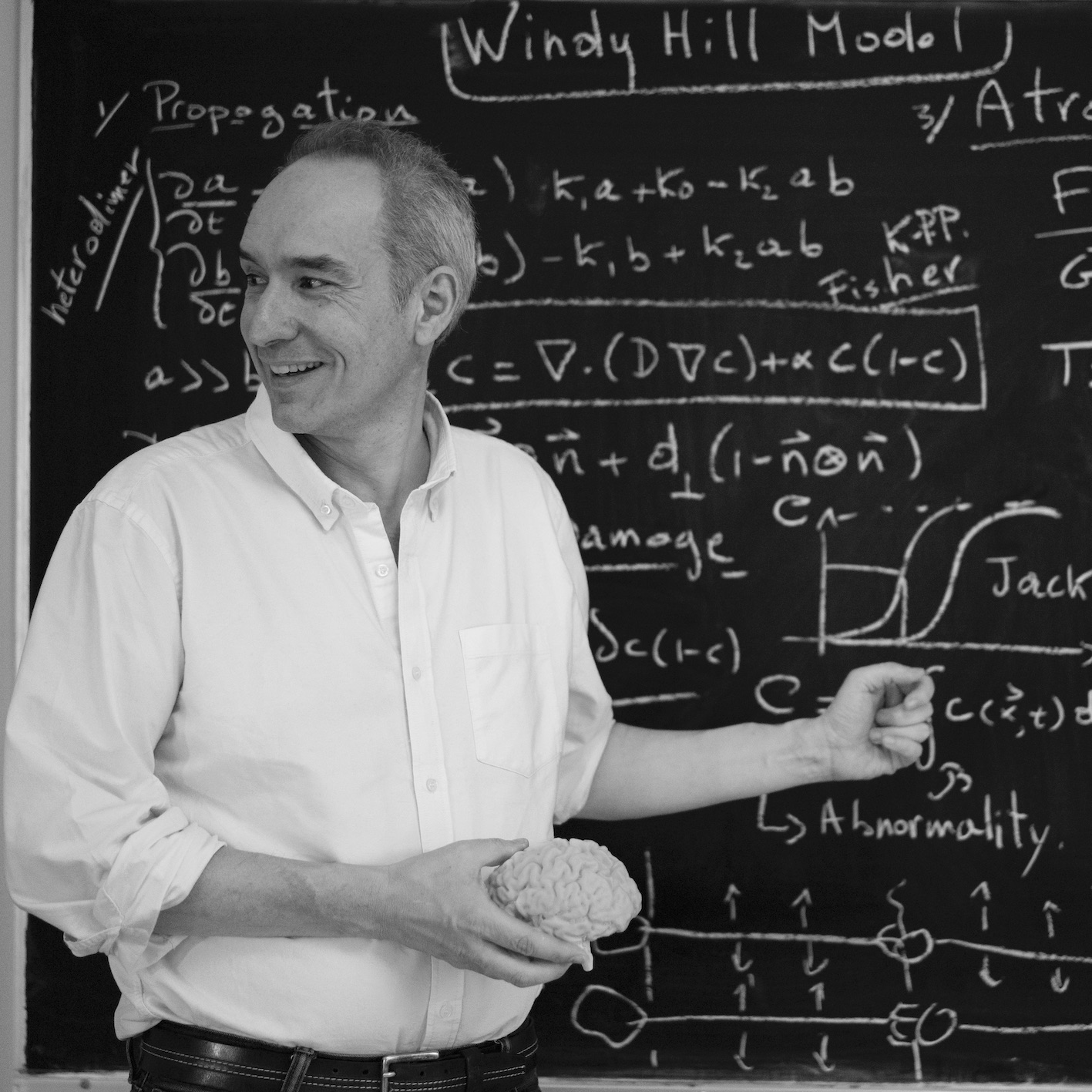
Alain Goriely FRS, appointed Gresham Professor of Geometry in 2024

The Professor of Geometry at Gresham College, London, gives free educational lectures to the general public. The college was founded for this purpose in 1597, when it created seven professorships; this was later increased to ten. Geometry is one of the original professorships as set out by the will of Thomas Gresham in 1575. The Professor of Geometry is appointed in partnership with the City of London Corporation.

== List of Gresham Professors of Geometry ==
Note, the notation used in dates given as, for example, "159 6/7" refer to the practice of dual dating dates between 1 January and 25 March.

	Name	Started
1	Henry Briggs	March 159 6/7
2	Peter Turner	25 July 1620
3	John Greaves	22 February 16 30/31
4	Ralph Button	15 November 1643
5	Daniel Whistler	13 June 1648
6	Laurence Rooke	7 August 1657
7	Isaac Barrow	16 July 1662
8	Arthur Dacres	20 May 1664
9	Robert Hooke	20 March 166 4/5
10	Andrew Tooke	5 July 1704
11	Thomas Tomlinson	3 July 1729
12	George Newland	27 Jan 173 1/2
13	William Roman	28 Nov 1749
14	Wilfred Clarke	28 August 1759
15	S. Kittleby	5 March 1765
16	Samuel Birch	5 July 1808
17	Robert Pitt Edkins	22 July 1848
18	Benjamin Morgan Cowie	18 Dec 1854
19	Karl Pearson	15 Dec 1890
20	William Henry Wagstaff	13 June 1894
1939–45 Lectures in abeyance
21	Louis Melville Milne-Thomson	29 May 1946
22	Thomas A. A. Broadbent	1956
23	Sir Bryan Thwaites	1969
24	Clive W. Kilmister	1972
25	Sir Christopher Zeeman	1988
26	Ian Stewart FRS	1994
27	Sir Roger Penrose FRS	1 Sept 1998
28	Harold Thimbleby	1 Sept 2001
29	Robin Wilson	1 Sept 2004
30	John D. Barrow	1 Sept 2008
31	Raymond Flood	2012
32	Chris Budd OBE	2016
33	Sarah Hart	2020
34	Alain Goriely	2024
