= Hermann Rothe =

Austrian mathematician

Hermann Rothe (28 December 1882 in Vienna – 18 December 1923 in Vienna) was an Austrian mathematician.

Rothe studied at the University of Vienna and the University of Göttingen. He attained the Doctorate in Engineering in 1909 in Vienna. Then he was assistant at the Vienna University of Technology, where he attained the Habilitation in 1910. In 1913 Rothe married and began to teach mathematics at the Vienna University of Technology as Professor extraordinarius, and from 1920 as Professor ordinarius. In 1923 he died after a long disease.

Rothe is known for his collaboration (1910–1912) with Philipp Frank on special relativity. Based on group theory, they tried to derive the Lorentz transformation without the postulate of the constancy of the speed of light.

Furthermore, Rothe worked — outside his teaching activity — on mathematical problems like Hermann Grassmann's "Ausdehnungslehre" (theory of extension, or exterior algebra).

== Publications ==
- Frank, P.; Rothe, H. (1911). "Über die Transformation der Raum-Zeitkoordinaten von ruhenden auf bewegte Systeme". Annalen der Physik. 34 (5): 825–855. Bibcode:1911AnP...339..825F. doi:10.1002/andp.19113390502.
- Rothe, H. (1921). "Systeme geometrischer Analyse". Encyklopädie der mathematischen Wissenschaften mit Einschluss ihrer Anwendungen. 3 (1).

== See also ==
- Equichordal point problem
- Postulates of special relativity
