= Harold Thimbleby =

British computer scientist (born 1955)

Harold W. Thimbleby
- Citizenship: British
- Occupation: Computer Scientist

Academic background
- Education: Professor Emeritus

Academic work
- Institutions: University College London Gresham College

Harold W. Thimbleby FLSW FRCPE HonFRCP (born 19 July 1955) is an emeritus professor of computer science at Swansea University. He is known for his works on user interface design within the realm of human computer interaction.

== Overview ==
Harold Thimbleby held the post of director of UCLIC, University College London's Interaction Centre, from its establishment in 2001. From 2001 to 2004, he was also the 28th Professor of Geometry at Gresham College, London. Thimbleby founded the Future Interaction Technology Lab at Swansea University in 2005.

Thimbleby ran the Swansea University Research Forum, as well as giving talks on science and religion.

== Research interests ==
Thimbleby's research interests include:

- Interactive handwriting calculators
- Improving medical devices
- Improving ethics in research
- Markov Modeling
- Matrix Modeling

== Selected works ==
- Article on literate programming,1986 (Winner of the British Computer Society Wilkes Award.)
- User Interface Design, Addison-Wesley, 1990.
- HyperProgramming, with G. F. Coulouris, Addison-Wesley, 1990.
- Press On, MIT Press, 2007. (Winner, in the Computer and Information Sciences category, of the Association of American Publishers' Publishing Awards for Excellence competition.)
- The Diversity and Ethics, with Paul Cairns, University College London Interaction Center.
