= Heteroclinic network =

In mathematics, a heteroclinic network is an invariant set in the phase space of a dynamical system. It can be thought of loosely as the union of more than one heteroclinic cycle. Heteroclinic networks arise naturally in a number of different types of applications, including fluid dynamics and populations dynamics.

The dynamics of trajectories near to heteroclinic networks is intermittent: trajectories spend a long time performing one type of behaviour (often, close to equilibrium), before switching rapidly to another type of behaviour. This type of intermittent switching behaviour has led to several different groups of researchers using them as a way to model and understand various type of neural dynamics.
