= Heteroclinic orbit =

Path between equilibrium points in a phase space

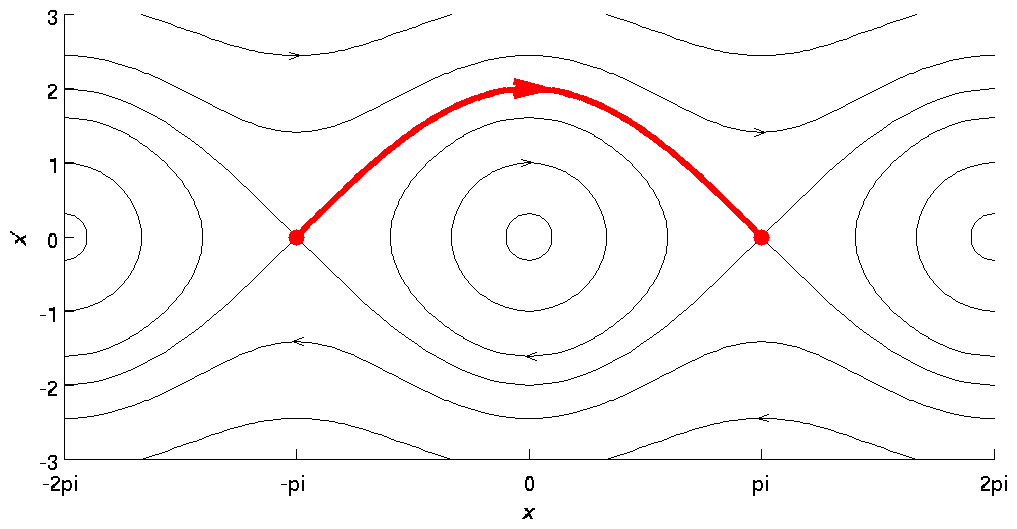
The phase portrait of the pendulum equation x ″ + sin x = 0. The highlighted curve shows the heteroclinic orbit from (x, x′) = (–π, 0) to (x, x′) = (π, 0). This orbit corresponds with the (rigid) pendulum starting upright, making one revolution through its lowest position, and ending upright again.

In mathematics, in the phase portrait of a dynamical system, a heteroclinic orbit (sometimes called a heteroclinic connection) is a path in phase space which joins two different equilibrium points. If the equilibrium points at the start and end of the orbit are the same, the orbit is a homoclinic orbit.

Consider the continuous dynamical system described by the ordinary differential equation $\dot x = f(x).$ Suppose there are equilibria at $x=x_0,x_1.$ Then a solution $\phi(t)$ is a heteroclinic orbit from $x_0$ to $x_1$ if both limits are satisfied: $\begin{array}{rcl} \phi(t) \rightarrow x_0 &\text{as}& t \rightarrow -\infty, \\[4pt] \phi(t) \rightarrow x_1 &\text{as}& t \rightarrow +\infty. \end{array}$

This implies that the orbit is contained in the stable manifold of $x_1$ and the unstable manifold of $x_0$.

== Symbolic dynamics ==
By using the Markov partition, the long-time behaviour of hyperbolic system can be studied using the techniques of symbolic dynamics. In this case, a heteroclinic orbit has a particularly simple and clear representation. Suppose that $S=\{1,2,\ldots,M\}$ is a finite set of M symbols. The dynamics of a point x is then represented by a bi-infinite string of symbols

$$\sigma =\{(\ldots,s_{-1},s_0,s_1,\ldots) : s_k \in S \; \forall k \in \mathbb{Z} \}$$

A periodic point of the system is simply a recurring sequence of letters. A heteroclinic orbit is then the joining of two distinct periodic orbits. It may be written as

$$p^\omega s_1 s_2 \cdots s_n q^\omega$$

where $p= t_1 t_2 \cdots t_k$ is a sequence of symbols of length k, (of course, $t_i\in S$), and $q = r_1 r_2 \cdots r_m$ is another sequence of symbols, of length m (likewise, $r_i\in S$). The notation $p^\omega$ simply denotes the repetition of p an infinite number of times. Thus, a heteroclinic orbit can be understood as the transition from one periodic orbit to another. By contrast, a homoclinic orbit can be written as

$$p^\omega s_1 s_2 \cdots s_n p^\omega$$

with the intermediate sequence $s_1 s_2 \cdots s_n$ being non-empty, and, of course, not being p, as otherwise, the orbit would simply be $p^\omega$.

== See also ==
- Heteroclinic connection
- Heteroclinic cycle
- Heteroclinic bifurcation
- Homoclinic orbit
- Traveling wave
