= Perturbation problem beyond all orders =

Type of perturbation problem

In mathematics, perturbation theory works typically by expanding unknown quantity in a power series in a small parameter. However, in a perturbation problem beyond all orders, all coefficients of the perturbation expansion vanish and the difference between the function and the constant function 0 cannot be detected by a power series.

A simple example is understood by an attempt at trying to expand $e^{-1/\epsilon}$ in a Taylor series in $\epsilon > 0$ about 0. All terms in a naïve Taylor expansion are identically zero. This is because the function $e^{-1/z}$ possesses an essential singularity at $z = 0$ in the complex $z$-plane, and therefore the function is most appropriately modeled by a Laurent series -- a Taylor series has a zero radius of convergence. Thus, if a physical problem possesses a solution of this nature, possibly in addition to an analytic part that may be modeled by a power series, the perturbative analysis fails to recover the singular part. Terms of nature similar to $e^{-1/\epsilon}$ are considered to be "beyond all orders" of the standard perturbative power series.

== See also ==
Asymptotic expansion
