= Homoclinic connection =

Homoclinic and heteroclinic connections and intersections

In dynamical systems, a branch of mathematics, a homoclinic connection is a structure formed by the stable manifold and unstable manifold of a fixed point.

== Definition for maps ==
Let $f:M\to M$ be a map defined on a manifold $M$, with a fixed point $p$. Let $W^s(f,p)$ and $W^u(f,p)$ be the stable manifold and the unstable manifold of the fixed point $p$, respectively. Let $V$ be a connected invariant manifold such that

$$V\subseteq W^s(f,p)\cap W^u(f,p)$$

Then $V$ is called a homoclinic connection.

== Heteroclinic connection ==
It is a similar notion, but it refers to two fixed points, $p$ and $q$. The condition satisfied by $V$ is replaced with:

$$V\subseteq W^s(f,p)\cap W^u(f,q)$$

This notion is not symmetric with respect to $p$ and $q$.

== Homoclinic and heteroclinic intersections ==
When the invariant manifolds $W^s(f,p)$ and $W^u(f,q)$, possibly with $p=q$, intersect but there is no homoclinic/heteroclinic connection, a different structure is formed by the two manifolds, sometimes referred to as the homoclinic/heteroclinic tangle. The figure has a conceptual drawing illustrating their complicated structure. The theoretical result supporting the drawing is the lambda-lemma. Homoclinic tangles are always accompanied by a Smale horseshoe.

== Definition for continuous flows ==
For continuous flows, the definition is essentially the same.

== Comments ==
1. There is some variation in the definition across various publications;
2. Historically, the first case considered was that of a continuous flow on the plane, induced by an ordinary differential equation. In this case, a homoclinic connection is a single trajectory that converges to the fixed point $p$ both forwards and backwards in time. A pendulum in the absence of friction is an example of a mechanical system that does have a homoclinic connection. When the pendulum is released from the top position (the point of highest potential energy), with infinitesimally small velocity, the pendulum will return to the same position. Upon return, it will have exactly the same velocity. The time it will take to return will increase to $\infty$ as the initial velocity goes to zero. One of the demonstrations in the pendulum article exhibits this behavior.

== Significance ==
When a dynamical system is perturbed, a homoclinic connection splits. It becomes a disconnected invariant set. Near it, there will be a chaotic set called Smale's horseshoe. Thus, the existence of a homoclinic connection can potentially lead to chaos. For example, when a pendulum is placed in a box, and the box is subjected to small horizontal oscillations, the pendulum may exhibit chaotic behavior.

== See also ==
- Homoclinic orbit
- Heteroclinic orbit
