= Rufus Bowen =

American mathematician (1947–1978)

Robert Edward Bowen
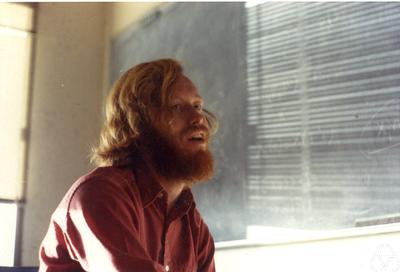
- Bowen in 1974
- Born: Robert Edward Bowen; February 23, 1947; Vallejo, California, U.S.
- Died: July 30, 1978 (aged 31); Santa Rosa, California, U.S.
- Education: University of California, Berkeley
- Known for: Dynamical systems theory Bowen's formula
- Scientific career
- Fields: Mathematics
- Workplaces: University of California, Berkeley
- Doctoral advisor: Stephen Smale
- Doctoral students: Brian Marcus; Lai-Sang Young

Robert Edward "Rufus" Bowen (February 23, 1947 – July 30, 1978) was an American internationally known professor in the Department of Mathematics at the University of California, Berkeley, who specialized in dynamical systems theory. Bowen's work dealt primarily with axiom A systems, but the methods he used while exploring topological entropy, symbolic dynamics, ergodic theory, Markov partitions, and invariant measures "have application far beyond the axiom A systems for which they were invented." The Bowen Lectures at the University of California, Berkeley, are given in his honor.

== Life ==
Robert Edward Bowen was born in Vallejo, California, to Marie DeWinter Bowen, a school teacher, and Emery Bowen, a Travis Air Force Base budget officer, but he grew up fifteen miles away in Fairfield, California, where he attended the public schools and graduated from Armijo High School in 1964. His senior yearbook documents that he played two years of varsity basketball, was a member of the science, math, and language clubs, and was President of the senior class. During his first three years of high school, he finished 102nd, 7th, and 2nd among Californians in the MAA (Mathematical Association of America) mathematics test. In 1964, he finished second in the Westinghouse (now Intel) Science Talent Search in Washington, D.C. During his senior year in high school, his first published paper appeared in the American Mathematical Monthly.

As an undergraduate at the University of California, Berkeley, Bowen was a Putnam Fellow in 1964 and 1965. He earned his bachelor's degree from Berkeley where he received, on 15 June 1967, the University Medal as the most distinguished graduating senior. He also received the Dorothea Klumpke Roberts Prize (as top mathematics student) and the Mathematics Department Citation. At this time, Bowen was quoted as saying, "I'm slightly involved in political activity." He was "active in organizations devoted to preventing nuclear war."

Bowen married Carol Twito of Hayward on 6 March 1968. They had no children.

In 1970, Bowen completed his doctorate in mathematics at Berkeley under Stephen Smale, and joined the faculty as assistant professor in that year. At this time he began calling himself Rufus, the nickname he had been given because of his red hair and beard. He was an invited speaker at the 1974 International Congress of Mathematicians in Vancouver, British Columbia. He was promoted to full professorship in 1977.

Bowen's mature work dealt with dynamical systems theory, a field which Smale, Bowen's dissertation advisor, explored and broadened in the 1960s.

As studied by Smale, a dynamical system comprises a manifold $M$ and a smooth mapping $f\colon M \to M$ ... As Poincaré emphasized, there is no general procedure for this, and therefore one must resort to describing average, typical, or most probable behavior. Bowen's work is an important part of the program of expressing these vague ideas in mathematically precise and useful ways.

Bowen died in Santa Rosa of a cerebral hemorrhage "at the start of what was to have been a vacation trip." Berkeley's Mathematics Department Chairman John L. Kelley called Bowen a "remarkable, brilliant professor and superb teacher." Dennis Sullivan wrote, in the issue of Publications Mathématiques de l'IHÉS dedicated to Bowen's memory,

Rufus was special, and I could close with Mike Shub's comment, "Don't forget to say that we all liked him".

== Posthumous honor ==
Since 1981, an eminent mathematician or scientist has spoken each year under the auspices of The Bowen Lectures at Berkeley. According to the university, "The Bowen Lectures are supported by an anonymous donor, who was an undergraduate student of Rufus Bowen." Roger Penrose gave the talks in 2002-3 and Edward Witten lectured in 2006–7.

== Selected published works ==
- Bowen: "The sequence $ka$^{$n$}+1 composite for all $n$", American Mathematical Monthly, vol. 71 (1964), pp. 175–6.
- Bowen: "Topological Entropy and Axiom A" in Global Analysis (Proceedings of Symposia in Pure Mathematics, vol. XIV), American Mathematical Society (Providence, 1970), Shiing-Shen Chern and Stephen Smale, editors, pp. 23–41.
- Bowen: "Markov partitions for Axiom A diffeomorphisms", American Journal of Mathematics, vol. 92 (1970), pp. 725–747.
- Bowen: "Periodic points and measures for Axiom A diffeomorphisms", Transactions of the American Mathematical Society, 1971, pp. 377–397.
- Bowen: "Symbolic Dynamics for Hyperbolic Flows" in Proceedings of the International Congress of Mathematicians (Vancouver, 1974), pp. 299–302.
- Bowen: Equilibrium States and the Ergodic Theory of Anosov Diffeomorphisms. (Lecture Notes in Mathematics, no. 470: A. Dold and B. Eckmann, editors). Springer-Verlag (Heidelberg, 1975), 108 pp.
- Bowen and David Ruelle: "The ergodic theory of Axiom A flows", Inventiones Mathematicae, vol. 29 (1975), pp. 181–202.
- Bowen: "Entropy for Maps of the Interval", Topology, vol. 16 (1977); pp. 465–467.
- Bowen: "A Model for Couette Flow-data", in Turbulence Seminar, Proceedings 1976/77 (New York, 1977), P. Bernard and T. Ratiu, editors; pp. 117–133.
- Bowen: On Axiom A Diffeomorphisms, (Regional Conference Series in Mathematics, no. 35), Conference Board of the Mathematical Sciences (Providence, 1978), 45 pp. ISBN 0-8218-1685-3.
- Bowen: "Hausdorff Dimension of Quasi-circles", Publications Mathématiques de l'IHÉS, no. 50 (1979), pp. 11–26.
- Bowen: Equilibrium States and the Ergodic Theory of Anosov Diffeomorphisms, 2nd Edition, edited by Jean-René Chazottes. Springer-Verlag (Berlin, 2008). ISBN 978-3-540-77605-5.
