= Axiom A =

Definition of a class of dynamical systems

In mathematics, Smale's axiom A defines a class of dynamical systems which have been extensively studied and whose dynamics is relatively well understood. A prominent example is the Smale horseshoe map. The term "axiom A" originates with Stephen Smale. The importance of such systems is demonstrated by the chaotic hypothesis, which states that, 'for all practical purposes', a many-body thermostatted system is approximated by an Anosov system.

== Definition ==
Let M be a smooth manifold with a diffeomorphism f: M→M. Then f is an axiom A diffeomorphism if the following two conditions hold:

1. The nonwandering set of f, Ω(f), is a hyperbolic set and compact.
2. The set of periodic points of f is dense in Ω(f).

For surfaces, hyperbolicity of the nonwandering set implies the density of periodic points, but this is no longer true in higher dimensions. Nonetheless, axiom A diffeomorphisms are sometimes called hyperbolic diffeomorphisms, because the portion of M where the interesting dynamics occurs, namely, Ω(f), exhibits hyperbolic behavior.

Axiom A diffeomorphisms generalize Morse–Smale systems, which satisfy further restrictions (finitely many periodic points and transversality of stable and unstable submanifolds). Smale horseshoe map is an axiom A diffeomorphism with infinitely many periodic points and positive topological entropy.

== Properties ==
Any Anosov diffeomorphism satisfies axiom A. In this case, the whole manifold M is hyperbolic (although it is an open question whether the non-wandering set Ω(f) constitutes the whole M).

Rufus Bowen showed that the non-wandering set Ω(f) of any axiom A diffeomorphism supports a Markov partition. Thus the restriction of f to a certain generic subset of Ω(f) is conjugated to a shift of finite type.

The density of the periodic points in the non-wandering set implies its local maximality: there exists an open neighborhood U of Ω(f) such that

$$\cap_{n\in \mathbb Z} f^{n} (U)=\Omega(f).$$

== Omega stability ==
An important property of Axiom A systems is their structural stability against small perturbations. That is, trajectories of the perturbed system remain in 1-1 topological correspondence with the unperturbed system. This property is important, in that it shows that Axiom A systems are not exceptional, but are in a sense 'robust'.

More precisely, for every C^{1}-perturbation f_{ε} of f, its non-wandering set is formed by two compact, f_{ε}-invariant subsets Ω_{1} and Ω_{2}. The first subset is homeomorphic to Ω(f) via a homeomorphism h which conjugates the restriction of f to Ω(f) with the restriction of f_{ε} to Ω_{1}:

$$f_\epsilon\circ h(x)=h\circ f(x), \quad \forall x\in \Omega(f).$$

If Ω_{2} is empty then h is onto Ω(f_{ε}). If this is the case for every perturbation f_{ε} then f is called omega stable. A diffeomorphism f is omega stable if and only if it satisfies axiom A and the no-cycle condition (that an orbit, once having left a transitive subset of Ω(f), does not return).

== See also ==
- Ergodic flow
