= Homoclinic orbit =

Closed loop through a phase space

A homoclinic orbit

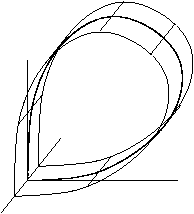
An oriented homoclinic orbit

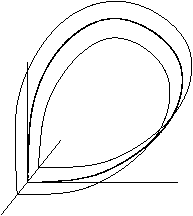
A twisted homoclinic orbit

In the study of dynamical systems, a homoclinic orbit is a path through phase space which joins a saddle equilibrium point to itself. More precisely, a homoclinic orbit lies in the intersection of the stable manifold and the unstable manifold of an equilibrium. It is a heteroclinic orbit–a path between any two equilibrium points–in which the endpoints are one and the same.

Consider the continuous dynamical system described by the ordinary differential equation

$$\dot x=f(x)$$

Suppose there is an equilibrium at $x=x_0$, then a solution $\Phi(t)$ is a homoclinic orbit if

$$\Phi(t)\rightarrow x_0\quad \mathrm{as}\quad
t\rightarrow\pm\infty$$

If the phase space has three or more dimensions, then it is important to consider the topology of the unstable manifold of the saddle point. The figures show two cases. First, when the stable manifold is topologically a cylinder, and secondly, when the unstable manifold is topologically a Möbius strip; in this case the homoclinic orbit is called twisted.

== Discrete dynamical system ==
Homoclinic orbits and homoclinic points are defined in the same way for iterated functions, as the intersection of the stable set and unstable set of some fixed point or periodic point of the system.

We also have the notion of homoclinic orbit when considering discrete dynamical systems. In such a case, if $f:M\rightarrow M$ is a diffeomorphism of a manifold $M$, we say that $x$ is a homoclinic point if it has the same past and future - more specifically, if there exists a fixed (or periodic) point $p$ such that

$$\lim_{n\rightarrow \pm\infty}f^n(x)=p.$$

== Properties ==
The existence of one homoclinic point implies the existence of an infinite number of them. This comes from its definition: the intersection of a stable and unstable set. Both sets are invariant by definition, which means that the forward iteration of the homoclinic point is both on the stable and unstable set. By iterating N times, the map approaches the equilibrium point by the stable set, but in every iteration it is on the unstable manifold too, which shows this property.

This property suggests that complicated dynamics arise by the existence of a homoclinic point. Indeed, Smale (1967) showed that these points leads to horseshoe map like dynamics, which is associated with chaos.

== Symbolic dynamics ==
By using the Markov partition, the long-time behaviour of a hyperbolic system can be studied using the techniques of symbolic dynamics. In this case, a homoclinic orbit has a particularly simple and clear representation. Suppose that $S=\{1,2,\ldots,M\}$ is a finite set of M symbols. The dynamics of a point x is then represented by a bi-infinite string of symbols

$$\sigma =\{(\ldots,s_{-1},s_0,s_1,\ldots) : s_k \in S \; \forall k \in \mathbb{Z} \}$$

A periodic point of the system is simply a recurring sequence of letters. A heteroclinic orbit is then the joining of two distinct periodic orbits. It may be written as

$$p^\omega s_1 s_2 \cdots s_n q^\omega$$

where $p= t_1 t_2 \cdots t_k$ is a sequence of symbols of length k, (of course, $t_i\in S$), and $q = r_1 r_2 \cdots r_m$ is another sequence of symbols, of length m (likewise, $r_i\in S$). The notation $p^\omega$ simply denotes the repetition of p an infinite number of times. Thus, a heteroclinic orbit can be understood as the transition from one periodic orbit to another. By contrast, a homoclinic orbit can be written as

$$p^\omega s_1 s_2 \cdots s_n p^\omega$$

with the intermediate sequence $s_1 s_2 \cdots s_n$ being non-empty, and, of course, not being p, as otherwise, the orbit would simply be $p^\omega$.

== See also ==
- Heteroclinic orbit
- Homoclinic bifurcation
