= Anosov diffeomorphism =

Diffeomorphism that has a hyperbolic structure on the tangent bundle

In mathematics, more particularly in the fields of dynamical systems and geometric topology, an Anosov map on a manifold M is a certain type of mapping, from M to itself, with rather clearly marked local directions of "expansion" and "contraction". Anosov systems are a special case of Axiom A systems.

Anosov diffeomorphisms were introduced by Dmitri Victorovich Anosov, who proved that their behaviour was in an appropriate sense generic (when they exist at all).

== Overview ==
Three closely related definitions must be distinguished:

- If a differentiable map f on M has a hyperbolic structure on the tangent bundle, then it is called an Anosov map. Examples include the Bernoulli map, and Arnold's cat map.
- If the map is a diffeomorphism, then it is called an Anosov diffeomorphism.
- If a flow on a manifold splits the tangent bundle into three invariant subbundles, with one subbundle that is exponentially contracting, and one that is exponentially expanding, and a third, non-expanding, non-contracting one-dimensional sub-bundle (spanned by the flow direction), then the flow is called an Anosov flow.

A classical example of Anosov diffeomorphism is the Arnold's cat map.

Anosov proved that Anosov diffeomorphisms are structurally stable and form an open subset of mappings (flows) with the C^{1} topology.

Not every manifold admits an Anosov diffeomorphism; for example, there are no such diffeomorphisms on the sphere . The simplest examples of compact manifolds admitting them are the tori: they admit the so-called linear Anosov diffeomorphisms, which are linear isomorphisms having no eigenvalue of modulus 1. It was proved that any other Anosov diffeomorphism on a torus is topologically conjugate to one of this kind.

The problem of classifying manifolds that admit Anosov diffeomorphisms turned out to be very difficult, and still as of 2023 has no answer for dimension over 3. The only known examples are infranilmanifolds, and it is conjectured that they are the only ones.

A sufficient condition for transitivity is that all points are nonwandering: $\Omega(f)=M$. This in turn holds for codimension-one Anosov diffeomorphisms (i.e., those for which the contracting or the expanding subbundle is one-dimensional) and for codimension one Anosov flows on manifolds of dimension greater than three as well as Anosov flows whose Mather spectrum is contained in two sufficiently thin annuli. It is not known whether Anosov diffeomorphisms are transitive (except on infranilmanifolds), but Anosov flows need not be topologically transitive.

Also, it is unknown if every $C^1$ volume-preserving Anosov diffeomorphism is ergodic. Anosov proved it under a $C^2$ assumption. It is also true for $C^{1+\alpha}$ volume-preserving Anosov diffeomorphisms.

For $C^2$ transitive Anosov diffeomorphism $f\colon M\to M$ there exists a unique SRB measure (the acronym stands for Sinai, Ruelle and Bowen) $\mu_f$ supported on $M$ such that its basin $B(\mu_f)$ is of full volume, where

$$B(\mu_f)= \left \{x\in M:\frac{1}{n}\sum_{k=0}^{n-1}\delta_{f^kx}\to\mu_f \right \}.$$

== Anosov flow on (tangent bundles of) Riemann surfaces ==
As an example, this section develops the case of the Anosov flow on the tangent bundle of a Riemann surface of negative curvature. This flow can be understood in terms of the flow on the tangent bundle of the Poincaré half-plane model of hyperbolic geometry. Riemann surfaces of negative curvature may be defined as Fuchsian models, that is, as the quotients of the upper half-plane and a Fuchsian group. For the following, let H be the upper half-plane; let Γ be a Fuchsian group; let M = H/Γ be a Riemann surface of negative curvature as the quotient of H by the action of the group Γ, and let $T^1 M$ be the tangent bundle of unit-length vectors on the manifold M, and let $T^1 H$ be the tangent bundle of unit-length vectors on H. Note that a bundle of unit-length vectors on a surface is the principal bundle of a complex line bundle.

=== Lie vector fields ===
One starts by noting that $T^1 H$ is isomorphic to the Lie group PSL(2,R). This group is the group of orientation-preserving isometries of the upper half-plane. The Lie algebra of PSL(2,R) is sl(2,R), and is spanned by the matrices

$$J=\begin{pmatrix} 1/2 &0\\ 0&-1/2\\ \end{pmatrix}, \qquad X=\begin{pmatrix}0&1\\ 0&0\\ \end{pmatrix}, \qquad Y=\begin{pmatrix}0&0\\ 1&0  \end{pmatrix}$$

with Lie bracket

$$[J,X]=X, \qquad [J,Y] = -Y, \qquad [X,Y] = 2J.$$

The exponential maps

$$g_t = \exp(tJ)= \begin{pmatrix}e^{t/2}&0\\ 0&e^{-t/2}\\ \end{pmatrix} \qquad h^*_t = \exp(tX)=\begin{pmatrix}1&t\\ 0&1\\ \end{pmatrix} \qquad h_t = \exp(tY)= \begin{pmatrix}1&0\\ t&1\\ \end{pmatrix}$$

define right-invariant flows on the manifold of $T^1 H = \operatorname{PSL}(2,\R)$, and likewise on $T^1M$. Defining $P=T^1H$ and $Q=T^1M$, these flows define vector fields on P and Q whose vectors lie in TP and TQ. These are just the standard, ordinary Lie vector fields on the manifold of a Lie group, and the presentation above is a standard exposition of a Lie vector field.

=== Anosov flow ===
The connection to the Anosov flow comes from the realization that $g_t$ is the geodesic flow on P and Q. Lie vector fields being (by definition) left invariant under the action of a group element, one has that these fields are left invariant under the specific elements $g_t$ of the geodesic flow. In other words, the spaces TP and TQ are split into three one-dimensional spaces, or subbundles, each of which are invariant under the geodesic flow. The final step is to notice that vector fields in one subbundle expand (and expand exponentially), those in another are unchanged, and those in a third shrink (and do so exponentially).

More precisely, the tangent bundle TQ may be written as the direct sum

$$TQ = E^+ \oplus E^0 \oplus E^-$$

or, at a point $g \cdot e = q \in Q$, the direct sum

$$T_qQ = E_q^+ \oplus E_q^0 \oplus E_q^-$$

corresponding to the Lie algebra generators Y, J and X, respectively, carried, by the left action of group element g, from the origin e to the point q. That is, one has $E_e^+=Y, E_e^0=J$ and $E_e^-=X$. These spaces are each subbundles, and are preserved (are invariant) under the action of the geodesic flow; that is, under the action of group elements $g=g_t$.

To compare the lengths of vectors in $T_qQ$ at different points q, one needs a metric. Any inner product at $T_eP=sl(2,\R)$ extends to a left-invariant Riemannian metric on P, and thus to a Riemannian metric on Q. The length of a vector $v \in E^+_q$ expands exponentially as exp(t) under the action of $g_t$. The length of a vector $v \in E^-_q$ shrinks exponentially as exp(-t) under the action of $g_t$. Vectors in $E^0_q$ are unchanged. This may be seen by examining how the group elements commute. The geodesic flow is invariant,

$$g_sg_t=g_tg_s=g_{s+t}$$

but the other two shrink and expand:

$$g_sh^*_t = h^*_{t\exp(-s)}g_s$$

and

$$g_sh_t = h_{t\exp(s)}g_s$$

where we recall that a tangent vector in $E^+_q$ is given by the derivative, with respect to t, of the curve $h_t$, the setting $t=0$.

=== Geometric interpretation of the Anosov flow ===
When acting on the point $z=i$ of the upper half-plane, $g_t$ corresponds to a geodesic on the upper half plane, passing through the point $z=i$. The action is the standard Möbius transformation action of SL(2,R) on the upper half-plane, so that

$$g_t \cdot i = \begin{pmatrix} \exp(t/2) & 0 \\  0 & \exp(-t/2) \end{pmatrix} \cdot i = i\exp(t)$$

A general geodesic is given by

$$\begin{pmatrix} a & b \\ c & d \end{pmatrix} \cdot i\exp(t) = \frac{ai\exp(t)+b}{ci\exp(t)+d}$$

with a, b, c and d real, with $ad-bc=1$. The curves $h^*_t$ and $h_t$ are called horocycles. Horocycles correspond to the motion of the normal vectors of a horosphere on the upper half-plane.

== See also ==
- Ergodic flow
- Morse–Smale system
- Pseudo-Anosov map
