= Kolmogorov automorphism =

Measure preserving automorphism

In mathematics, a Kolmogorov automorphism, K-automorphism, K-shift or K-system is an invertible, measure-preserving automorphism defined on a standard probability space that obeys Kolmogorov's zero–one law. All Bernoulli automorphisms are K-automorphisms (one says they have the K-property), but not vice versa. Many ergodic dynamical systems have been shown to have the K-property, although more recent research has shown that many of these are in fact Bernoulli automorphisms.

Although the definition of the K-property seems reasonably general, it stands in sharp distinction to the Bernoulli automorphism. In particular, the Ornstein isomorphism theorem does not apply to K-systems, and so the entropy is not sufficient to classify such systems – there exist uncountably many non-isomorphic K-systems with the same entropy. In essence, the collection of K-systems is large, messy and uncategorized; whereas the B-automorphisms are 'completely' described by Ornstein theory.

== Formal definition ==
Let $(X, \mathcal{B}, \mu)$ be a standard probability space, and let $T$ be an invertible, measure-preserving transformation. Then $T$ is called a K-automorphism, K-transform or K-shift, if there exists a sub-sigma algebra $\mathcal{K}\subset\mathcal{B}$ such that the following three properties hold:

$$\mbox{(1) }\mathcal{K}\subset T\mathcal{K}$$

$$\mbox{(2) }\bigvee_{n=0}^\infty T^n \mathcal{K}=\mathcal{B}$$

$$\mbox{(3) }\bigcap_{n=0}^\infty T^{-n} \mathcal{K} = \{X,\varnothing\}$$

Here, the symbol $\vee$ is the join of sigma algebras, while $\cap$ is set intersection. The equality should be understood as holding almost everywhere, that is, differing at most on a set of measure zero.

== Properties ==
Assuming that the sigma algebra is not trivial, that is, if $\mathcal{B}\ne\{X,\varnothing\}$, then $\mathcal{K}\ne T\mathcal{K}.$ It follows that K-automorphisms are strong mixing.

All Bernoulli automorphisms are K-automorphisms, but not vice versa.

Kolmogorov automorphisms are precisely the natural extensions of exact endomorphisms, i.e. mappings $T$ for which $\bigcap_{n=0}^\infty T^{-n} \mathcal{M}$ consists of measure-zero sets or their complements, where $\mathcal{M}$ is the sigma-algebra of measureable sets.
