= Translation surface =

In mathematics a translation surface is a surface obtained from identifying the sides of a polygon in the Euclidean plane by translations. An equivalent definition is a Riemann surface together with a holomorphic 1-form.

These surfaces arise in dynamical systems where they can be used to model billiards, and in Teichmüller theory. A particularly interesting subclass is that of Veech surfaces (named after William A. Veech) which are the most symmetric ones.

== Definitions ==
=== Geometric definition ===
A translation surface is the space obtained by identifying pairwise by translations the sides of a collection of plane polygons.

Here is a more formal definition. Let $P_1,\ldots,P_m$ be a collection of (not necessarily convex) polygons in the Euclidean plane and suppose that for every side $s_i$ of any $P_k$ there is a side $s_j$ of some $P_l$ with $j\not=i$ and $s_j = s_i + \vec v_i$ for some nonzero vector $\vec v_i$ (and so that $\vec v_j = -\vec v_i$. Consider the space obtained by identifying all $s_i$ with their corresponding $s_j$ through the map $x \mapsto x + \vec v_i$.

The canonical way to construct such a surface is as follows: start with vectors $\vec w_1, \ldots, \vec w_n$ and a permutation $\sigma$ on $\{1, \ldots, n\}$, and form the broken lines $L = x, x+\vec w_1, \ldots, x+\vec w_1+\cdots+\vec w_n$ and $L' = x, x+\vec w_{\sigma(1)}, \ldots, x+\vec w_{\sigma(1)}+\cdots+\vec w_{\sigma(n)}$ starting at an arbitrarily chosen point. In the case where these two lines form a polygon (i.e. they do not intersect outside of their endpoints) there is a natural side-pairing.

The quotient space is a closed surface. It has a flat metric outside the set $\Sigma$ images of the vertices. At a point in $\Sigma$ the sum of the angles of the polygons around the vertices which map to it is a positive multiple of $2\pi$, and the metric is singular unless the angle is exactly $2\pi$.

=== Analytic definition ===
Let $S$ be a translation surface as defined above and $\Sigma$ the set of singular points. Identifying the Euclidean plane with the complex plane one gets coordinate charts on $S \setminus \Sigma$ with values in $\mathbb C$. Moreover, the changes of charts are holomorphic maps, more precisely maps of the form $z \mapsto z + w$ for some $w \in \mathbb C$. This gives $S \setminus \Sigma$ the structure of a Riemann surface, which extends to the entire surface $S$ by Riemann's theorem on removable singularities. In addition, the differential $dz$, where $z : U \to \mathbb C$ is any chart defined above, does not depend on the chart. Thus these differentials defined on chart domains glue together to give a well-defined holomorphic 1-form $\omega$ on $S$; in other words, a translation surface may equivalently be described as a compact Riemann surface together with a nonzero holomorphic 1-form, also called an abelian differential. The vertices of the polygon where the cone angles are not equal to $2\pi$ are zeroes of $\omega$ (a cone angle of $2k\pi$ corresponds to a zero of order $(k-1)$).

In the other direction, given a pair $(X,\omega)$ where $X$ is a compact Riemann surface and $\omega$ is a holomorphic 1-form, one can construct a polygon by using the complex numbers $\int_{\gamma_j}\omega$ where $\gamma_j$ are disjoint paths between the zeroes of $\omega$ which form an integral basis for the relative cohomology.

=== Examples ===
The simplest example of a translation surface is obtained by gluing the opposite sides of a parallelogram. It is a flat torus with no singularities.

If $P$ is a regular $4g$-gon then the translation surface obtained by gluing opposite sides is of genus $g$ with a single singular point, with angle $(2g-1)2\pi$.

If $P$ is obtained by putting side to side a collection of copies of the unit square then any translation surface obtained from $P$ is called a square-tiled surface. The map from the surface to the flat torus obtained by identifying all squares is a branched covering with branch points the singularities (the cone angle at a singularity is proportional to the degree of branching).

=== Riemann–Roch and Gauss–Bonnet ===
Suppose that the surface $X$ is a closed Riemann surface of genus $g$ and that $\omega$ is a nonzero holomorphic 1-form on $X$, with zeroes of order $d_1, \ldots, d_m$. Then the Riemann–Roch theorem implies that

$$\sum_{j=1}^m d_j = 2g - 2.$$

If the translation surface $(X,\omega)$ is represented by a polygon $P$ then triangulating it and summing angles over all vertices allows to recover the formula above (using the relation between cone angles and order of zeroes), in the same manner as in the proof of the Gauss–Bonnet formula for hyperbolic surfaces or the proof of Euler's formula from Girard's theorem.

=== Translation surfaces as foliated surfaces ===
If $(X,\omega)$ is a translation surface there is a natural measured foliation on $X$. If it is obtained from a polygon it is just the image of vertical lines, and the measure of an arc is just the euclidean length of the horizontal segment homotopic to the arc. The foliation is also obtained by the level lines of the imaginary part of a (local) primitive for $\omega$ and the measure is obtained by integrating the real part.

== Moduli spaces ==
=== Strata ===
Let $\mathcal H$ be the set of translation surfaces of genus $g$ (where two such $(X,\omega), (X',\omega')$ are considered the same if there exists a holomorphic diffeomorphism $\phi:X \to X'$ such that $\phi^*\omega' = \omega$). Let $\mathcal M_g$ be the moduli space of Riemann surfaces of genus $g$; there is a natural map $\mathcal H \to \mathcal M_g$ mapping a translation surface to the underlying Riemann surface. This turns $\mathcal H$ into a locally trivial fiber bundle over the moduli space.

To a compact translation surface $(X, \omega)$ there is associated the data $(k_1,\ldots,k_m)$ where $k_1\le k_2\le\cdots$ are the orders of the zeroes of $\omega$. If $\alpha = (k_1,\ldots,k_m)$ is any integer partition of $2g - 2$ then the stratum $\mathcal H(\alpha)$ is the subset of $\mathcal H$ of translation surfaces which have a holomorphic form whose zeroes match the partition.

The stratum $\mathcal H(\alpha)$ is naturally a complex orbifold of complex dimension $2g + m - 1$ (note that $\mathcal H(0)$ is the moduli space of tori, which is well-known to be an orbifold; in higher genus, the failure to be a manifold is even more dramatic). Local coordinates are given by

$$(X,\omega) \mapsto \left(\int_{\gamma_1} \omega, \ldots, \int_{\gamma_n} \omega\right)$$

where $n=\dim(H_1(S, \{x_1,\ldots,x_m\})) = 2g + m - 1$ and $\gamma_1,\ldots, \gamma_k$ is as above a symplectic basis of this space.

=== Masur-Veech volumes ===
The stratum $\mathcal H(\alpha)$ admits a ${\mathbb C}^*$-action and thus a real and complex projectivization ${\mathcal H(\alpha)} \to {\mathcal H}_1(\alpha) \to {\mathcal H}_2(\alpha)$. The real projectivization admits a natural section ${\mathcal H}_1(\alpha) \to {\mathcal H}(\alpha)$ if we define it as the space of translation surfaces of area 1.

The existence of the above period coordinates allows to endow the stratum $\mathcal H(\alpha)$ with an integral affine structure and thus a natural volume form $\nu$. We also get a volume form $\nu_1(\alpha)$ on ${\mathcal H}_1(\alpha)$ by disintegration of $\nu$. The Masur-Veech volume $Vol(\alpha)$ is the total volume of ${\mathcal H}_1(\alpha)$ for $\nu_1(\alpha)$. This volume was proved to be finite independently by William A. Veech and Howard Masur.

In the 90's Maxim Kontsevich and Anton Zorich evaluated these volumes numerically by counting the lattice points of ${\mathcal H}(\alpha)$. They observed that $Vol(\alpha)$ should be of the form $\pi^{2g}$ times a rational number. From this observation they expected the existence of a formula expressing the volumes in terms of intersection numbers on moduli spaces of curves.

Alex Eskin and Andrei Okounkov gave the first algorithm to compute these volumes. They showed that the generating series of these numbers are q-expansions of computable quasi-modular forms. Using this algorithm they could confirm the numerical observation of Kontsevich and Zorich.

More recently Chen, Möller, Sauvaget, and don Zagier showed that the volumes can be computed as intersection numbers on an algebraic compactification of ${\mathcal H}_2(\alpha)$. Currently the problem is still open to extend this formula to strata of half-translation surfaces.

=== The SL_{2}(R)-action ===
If $(X, \omega)$ is a translation surface obtained by identifying the faces of a polygon $P$ and $g \in \mathrm{SL}_2(\mathbb R)$ then the translation surface $g\cdot(X,\omega)$ is that associated to the polygon $g(P)$. This defined a continuous action of $\mathrm{SL}_2(\mathbb R)$ on the moduli space $\mathcal H$ which preserves the strata $\mathcal H(\alpha)$. This action descends to an action on ${\mathcal H}_1(\alpha)$ that is ergodic with respect to $\nu_1$.

== Half-translation surfaces ==
=== Definitions ===
A half-translation surface is defined similarly to a translation surface but allowing the gluing maps to have a nontrivial linear part which is a half turn. Formally, a translation surface is defined geometrically by taking a collection of polygons in the Euclidean plane and identifying faces by maps of the form $z \mapsto \pm z + w$ (a "half-translation"). Note that a face can be identified with itself. The geometric structure obtained in this way is a flat metric outside of a finite number of singular points with cone angles positive multiples of $\pi$.

As in the case of translation surfaces there is an analytic interpretation: a half-translation surface can be interpreted as a pair $(X, \phi)$ where $X$ is a Riemann surface and $\phi$ a quadratic differential on $X$. To pass from the geometric picture to the analytic picture one simply takes the quadratic differential defined locally by $(dz)^2$ (which is invariant under half-translations), and for the other direction one takes the Riemannian metric induced by $\phi$, which is smooth and flat outside of the zeros of $\phi$.

=== Relation with Teichmüller geometry ===
If $X$ is a Riemann surface then the vector space of quadratic differentials on $X$ is naturally identified with the tangent space to Teichmüller space at any point above $X$. This can be proven by analytic means using the Bers embedding. Half-translation surfaces can be used to give a more geometric interpretation of this: if $(X,g), (Y,h)$ are two points in Teichmüller space then by Teichmüller's mapping theorem there exists two polygons $P,Q$ whose faces can be identified by half-translations to give flat surfaces with underlying Riemann surfaces isomorphic to $X,Y$ respectively, and an affine map $f$ of the plane sending $P$ to $Q$ which has the smallest distortion among the quasiconformal mappings in its isotopy class, and which is isotopic to $h\circ g^{-1}$.

Everything is determined uniquely up to scaling if we ask that $f$ be of the form $f_s$, where $f_t:(x,y) \mapsto (e^t x, e^{-t} y)$, for some $s > 0$; we denote by $X_t$ the Riemann surface obtained from the polygon $f_t(P)$. Now the path $t \mapsto (X_t, f_t\circ g)$ in Teichmüller space joins $(X,g)$ to $(Y,h)$, and differentiating it at $t=0$ gives a vector in the tangent space; since $(Y,g)$ was arbitrary we obtain a bijection.

In facts the paths used in this construction are Teichmüller geodesics. An interesting fact is that while the geodesic ray associated to a flat surface corresponds to a measured foliation, and thus the directions in tangent space are identified with the Thurston boundary, the Teichmüller geodesic ray associated to a flat surface does not always converge to the corresponding point on the boundary, though almost all such rays do so.

== Veech surfaces ==
=== The Veech group ===
If $(X, \omega)$ is a translation surface its Veech group is the Fuchsian group which is the image in $\mathrm{PSL}_2(\mathbb R)$ of the subgroup $\mathrm{SL}(X,\omega) \subset \mathrm{SL}_2(\mathbb R)$ of transformations $g$ such that $g \cdot (X, \omega)$ is isomorphic (as a translation surface) to $(X, \omega)$. Equivalently, $\mathrm{SL}(X,\omega)$ is the group of derivatives of affine diffeomorphisms $(X, \omega) \to (X,\omega)$ (where affine is defined locally outside the singularities, with respect to the affine structure induced by the translation structure). Veech groups have the following properties:

- They are discrete subgroups in $\mathrm{PSL}_2(\mathbb R)$;
- They are never cocompact.

Veech groups can be either finitely generated or not.

=== Veech surfaces ===
A Veech surface is by definition a translation surface whose Veech group is a lattice in $\mathrm{PSL}_2(\mathbb R)$, equivalently its action on the hyperbolic plane admits a fundamental domain of finite volume. Since it is not cocompact it must then contain parabolic elements.

Examples of Veech surfaces are the square-tiled surfaces, whose Veech groups are commensurable to the modular group $\mathrm{PSL}_2(\mathbb Z)$. The square can be replaced by any parallelogram (the translation surfaces obtained are exactly those obtained as ramified covers of a flat torus). In fact the Veech group is arithmetic (which amounts to it being commensurable to the modular group) if and only if the surface is tiled by parallelograms.

There exists Veech surfaces whose Veech group is not arithmetic, for example the surface obtained from two regular pentagons glued along an edge: in this case the Veech group is a non-arithmetic Hecke triangle group. On the other hand, there are still some arithmetic constraints on the Veech group of a Veech surface: for example its trace field is a number field that is totally real.

== Geodesic flow on translation surfaces ==
=== Geodesics ===
A geodesic in a translation surface (or a half-translation surface) is a parametrised curve which is, outside of the singular points, locally the image of a straight line in Euclidean space parametrised by arclength. If a geodesic arrives at a singularity it is required to stop there. Thus a maximal geodesic is a curve defined on a closed interval, which is the whole real line if it does not meet any singular point. A geodesic is closed or periodic if its image is compact, in which case it is either a circle if it does not meet any singularity, or an arc between two (possibly equal) singularities. In the latter case the geodesic is called a saddle connection.

If $(X, \omega)$ $\theta \in \mathbb R/ 2\pi\mathbb Z$ (or $\theta \in \mathbb R/ \pi\mathbb Z$ in the case of a half-translation surface) then the geodesics with direction theta are well-defined on $X$: they are those curves $c$ which satisfy $\omega(\overset{\cdot}{c}) = e^{i\theta}$ (or $\phi(\overset{\cdot}{c}) = e^{i\theta}$ in the case of a half-translation surface $(X, \phi)$). The geodesic flow on $(X,\omega)$ with direction $\theta$ is the flow $\phi_t$ on $X$ where $t\mapsto\phi_t(p)$ is the geodesic starting at $p$ with direction $\theta$ if $p$ is not singular.

=== Dynamical properties ===
On a flat torus the geodesic flow in a given direction has the property that it is either periodic or ergodic. In general this is not true: there may be directions in which the flow is minimal (meaning every orbit is dense in the surface) but not ergodic. On the other hand, on a compact translation surface the flow retains from the simplest case of the flat torus the property that it is ergodic in almost every direction.

Another natural question is to establish asymptotic estimates for the number of closed geodesics or saddle connections of a given length. On a flat torus $T$ there are no saddle connections and the number of closed geodesics of length $\le L$ is equivalent to $L^2/\operatorname{volume}(T)$. In general one can only obtain bounds: if $(X, \omega)$ is a compact translation surface of genus $g$ then there exists constants (depending only on the genus) $c_1, c_2$ such that the both $N_{cg}(L)$ of closed geodesics and $N_{sc}(L)$ of saddle connections of length $\le L$ satisfy

$$\frac{c_1 L^2}{\operatorname{volume}(X,\omega)} \le N_{\mathrm{cg}}(L), N_{\mathrm{sc}}(L) \le \frac{c_2 L^2}{\operatorname{volume}(X,\omega)} .$$

Restraining to a probabilistic results it is possible to get better estimates: given a genus $g$, a partition $\alpha$ of $g$ and a connected component $\mathcal C$ of the stratum $\mathcal H(\alpha)$ there exists constants $c_{\mathrm{cg}}c_{\mathrm{sc}}$ such that for almost every $(X,\omega) \in \mathcal C$ the asymptotic equivalent holds:

$N_{\mathrm{cg}}(L) \sim \frac{c_{\mathrm{cg}} L^2}{\operatorname{volume}(X,\omega)}$, $N_{\mathrm{sc}}(L) \sim \frac{c_{\mathrm{sc}} L^2}{\operatorname{volume}(X,\omega)}.$

The constants $c_{\mathrm{cg}}, c_{\mathrm{sc}}$ are called Siegel–Veech constants. Using the ergodicity of the $\mathrm{SL}_2(\mathbb R)$-action on $\mathcal{H}(\alpha)$, it was shown that these constants can explicitly be computed as ratios of certain Masur-Veech volumes.

=== Veech dichotomy ===
The geodesic flow on a Veech surface is much better behaved than in general. This is expressed via the following result, called the Veech dichotomy:

Let $(X, \omega)$ be a Veech surface and $\theta$ a direction. Then either all trajectories defied over $\mathbb R$ are periodic or the flow in the direction $\theta$ is ergodic.

=== Relation with billiards ===
If $P_0$ is a polygon in the Euclidean plane and $\theta \in \mathbb R / 2\pi\mathbb Z$ a direction there is a continuous dynamical system called a billiard. The trajectory of a point inside the polygon is defined as follows: as long as it does not touch the boundary it proceeds in a straight line at unit speed; when it touches the interior of an edge it bounces back (i.e. its direction changes with an orthogonal reflection in the perpendicular of the edge), and when it touches a vertex it stops.

This dynamical system is equivalent to the geodesic flow on a flat surface: just double the polygon along the edges and put a flat metric everywhere but at the vertices, which become singular points with cone angle twice the angle of the polygon at the corresponding vertex. This surface is not a translation surface or a half-translation surface, but in some cases it is related to one. Namely, if all angles of the polygon $P_0$ are rational multiples of $\pi$ there is ramified cover of this surface which is a translation surface, which can be constructed from a union of copies of $P_0$. The dynamics of the billiard flow can then be studied through the geodesic flow on the translation surface.

For example, the billiard in a square is related in this way to the billiard on the flat torus constructed from four copies of the square; the billiard in an equilateral triangle gives rise to the flat torus constructed from an hexagon. The billiard in a "L" shape constructed from squares is related to the geodesic flow on a square-tiled surface; the billiard in the triangle with angles $\pi/5, \pi/5, 3\pi/5$ is related to the Veech surface constructed from two regular pentagons constructed above.

=== Relation with interval exchange transformations ===
Let $(X, \omega)$ be a translation surface and $\theta$ a direction, and let $\phi_t$ be the geodesic flow on $(X, \omega)$ with direction $\theta$. Let $I$ be a geodesic segment in the direction orthogonal to $\theta$, and defined the first recurrence, or Poincaré map $\sigma: I \to I$ as follows: $\sigma(p)$ is equal to $\phi_t(p)$ where $\phi_s(p) \not\in I$ for $0 < s < t$. Then this map is an interval exchange transformation and it can be used to study the dynamic of the geodesic flow.
