= Julio M. Ottino =

Argentine physicist

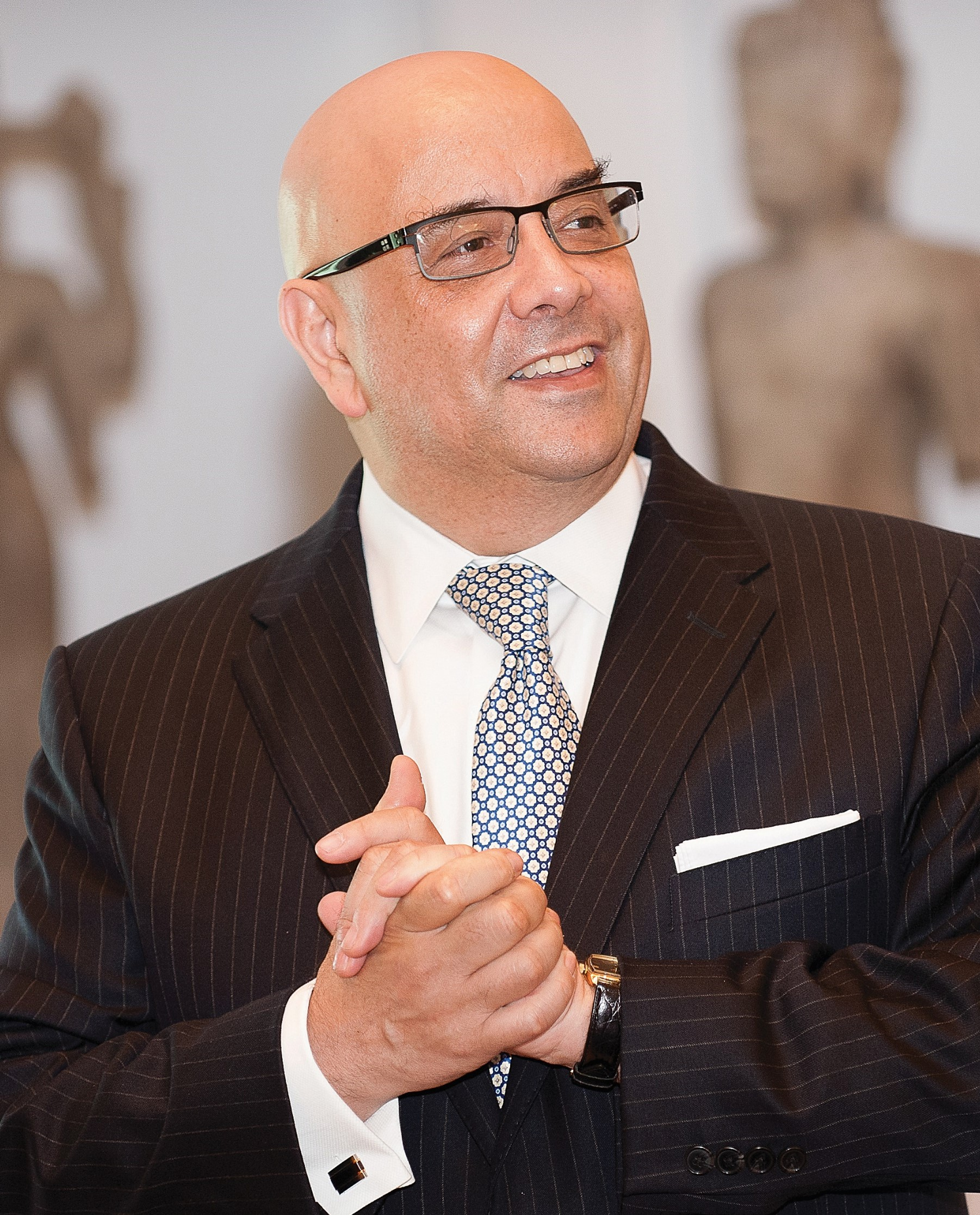
- Born: La Plata, Argentina
- Education: National University of La Plata, University of Minnesota
- Known for: fluid and chaotic mixing, mixing and chemical reactions, chaos and dynamical systems theory, complex systems, whole-brain engineering
- Awards: Bernard M. Gordon Prize for Innovation in Engineering and Technology Education, Fluid Dynamics Prize, John S. Guggenheim Fellowship
- Scientific career
- Doctoral advisor: William E. Ranz, Chris W. Macosko
- Website: www.juliomarioottino.com

Julio M. Ottino is an engineering scientist, author, artist, and educator. Trained as a chemical engineer, he is known for his research in fluid dynamics, chaos and mixing, and complex systems. He is currently the Distinguished Robert R. McCormick Institute Professor and Walter P. Murphy Professor of chemical and biological engineering at Northwestern University, and is also a professor of management and organizations in the Kellogg School of Management.

He previously served as the dean of the McCormick School of Engineering and Applied Science at Northwestern University from 2005-2023.

== Early life and education ==
Ottino was born in La Plata, Argentina. Growing up with twin interests in art and science, he received a degree in chemical engineering from the National University of La Plata in 1974. After this, while drafted as an officer in the Argentinean Navy, he mounted a solo art exhibit. Immediately after finishing a two-year term in the Navy, he got married and moved to the United States for graduate school in chemical engineering at the University of Minnesota, where he received his PhD in 1979.

== Career ==
After his PhD, Ottino held faculty positions at University of Massachusetts, Amherst and held visiting appointments at Caltech, Stanford, and the University of Minnesota before joining Northwestern in 1991.

He was chair of Northwestern's Department of Chemical Engineering from 1992 to 2000 and was founder and co-director of NICO, the Northwestern Institute for Complex Systems. In 2005, he became dean of Northwestern's McCormick School of Engineering. As dean, he developed the whole-brain engineering approach to research and education, integrating both left-brain analysis and right brain creativity through design, entrepreneurship, and leadership and personal development.

He created university-wide centers and initiatives, including the Segal Design Institute and the Farley Center for Entrepreneurship and Innovation.

In education, he launched several new master's degrees programs in analytics, artificial intelligence, robotics, and energy and sustainability. At the undergraduate level, he made the first-year Design Thinking and Communication course a centerpiece of the engineering education experience. He was instrumental in developing several cross-school initiatives, including the NUvention series of courses, which brought together university-wide multidisciplinary teams to create and launch startups, and the Bay Area Immersion program, which educates students at the intersection of design, technology, and digital media.

He was also instrumental in developing more education and programming at the intersection of fine arts. With the Block Museum, he developed the Artist-at-Large and the Art + Engineering program. He partnered with the Art Institute of Chicago to facilitate the creation of the Center for Scientific Studies in the Arts and to create joint courses such as "Data as Art."

During his tenure, applications to the engineering school quadrupled, and research funding doubled. In 2017, he was awarded the Bernard M. Gordon Prize for Innovation in Engineering and Technology Education from the National Academy of Engineering for developing and implementing whole-brain engineering.

In 2022, his book The Nexus: Augmented Thinking for a Complex World – The New Convergence of Art, Technology, and Science, co-authored with Bruce Mau, was published by MIT Press.

== Research ==
Ottino's experimental and theoretical work in chemical engineering connected the fields of chaos and fluid mixing. For the first 10 years of his career, Ottino's principal focus was on fluid mixing. He established the scientific basis of mixing and developed mathematical frameworks that showed flows can produce stretching and folding that creates chaotic motion and effective mixing. He has extended this foundational knowledge to applications including microfluidics, materials processing, and CO_{2} capture. Recently, Ottino turned his attention to the mixing and segregation of granular materials, exploiting the mathematics of piecewise isometries.

His research has been featured in articles and on the covers of Nature, Science, Scientific American, the Proceedings of the National Academy of Sciences of the USA and other publications and has impacted fields such as complex systems, microfluidics, geophysical sciences, and nonlinear dynamics and chaos. He has directed more than 65 PhD theses and is the author of nearly 250 papers and three books.

== Awards and honors ==
- 2025 Charles Russ Richards Memorial Award, American Society of Mechanical Engineers
- 2025 Malina Renaissance Medallion Award, Hagler Institute for Advance Study, Texas A&M University
- 43rd Annual Michelson Memorial Lecture (2024)
- Fellow, American Institute for Medical and Biological Engineering (2024)
- Member, National Academy of Sciences (2022)
- Founders Award, American Institute of Chemical Engineers (2018)
- Bernard M. Gordon Prize for Innovation in Engineering and Technology Education, National Academy of Engineering (2017)
- Fellow, American Institute of Chemical Engineers (2013)
- Fluid Dynamics Prize, American Physical Society (2008)
- "One Hundred Engineers of the Modern Era," American Institute of Chemical Engineers (2008)
- Member, American Academy of Arts and Sciences (2003)
- Ernest W. Thiele Award (AIChE, Chicago section) (2002)
- William H. Walker Award, American Institute of Chemical Engineers (2001)
- John S. Guggenheim Fellowship (2001)
- Member, National Academy of Engineering (1997)
- Fellow, American Association for the Advancement of Science (1996)
- Alpha Chi Sigma Award, American Institute of Chemical Engineers (1994)
- Fellow, American Physical Society, Division of Fluid Dynamics (1993)
- Presidential Young Investigator Award (NSF) (1984)

== Bibliography ==
- The Kinematics of Mixing: Stretching, Chaos, and Transport, Cambridge University Press, Cambridge, England 1989 (xiv, 364 pp., illus., + plates), reprinted 1990, 1997; 2004.
- Mathematical Foundations of Mixing: The Linked Twist Map as a Paradigm in Applications – Micro to Macro, Fluids to Solids, Cambridge University Press, Cambridge, England, 2006. Rob Sturman, Julio M. Ottino, and Stephen Wiggins.
- The Nexus: Augmented Thinking for a Complex World – The New Convergence of Art, Technology, and Science, MIT Press 2022. Julio Mario Ottino with Bruce Mau.
