= William A. Veech =

American mathematician

William A. Veech was the Edgar O. Lovett Professor of Mathematics at Rice University until his death. His research concerned dynamical systems; he is particularly known for his work on interval exchange transformations, and is the namesake of the Veech surface. He died unexpectedly on August 30, 2016 in Houston, Texas.

== Education ==
Veech graduated from Dartmouth College in 1960, and earned his Ph.D. in 1963 from Princeton University under the supervision of Salomon Bochner.

== Contributions ==
An interval exchange transformation is a dynamical system defined from a partition of the unit interval into finitely many smaller intervals, and a permutation on those intervals. Veech and Howard Masur independently discovered that, for almost every partition and every irreducible permutation, these systems are uniquely ergodic, and also made contributions to the theory of weak mixing for these systems. The Rauzy–Veech–Zorich induction map, a function from and to the space of interval exchange transformations is named in part after Veech: Rauzy defined the map, Veech constructed an infinite invariant measure for it, and Zorich strengthened Veech's result by making the measure finite.

The Veech surface and the related Veech group are named after Veech, as is the Veech dichotomy according to which geodesic flow on the Veech surface is either periodic or ergodic.

Veech played a role in the Nobel-prize-winning discovery of buckminsterfullerene in 1985 by a team of Rice University chemists including Richard Smalley. At that time, Veech was chair of the Rice mathematics department, and was asked by Smalley to identify the shape that the chemists had determined for this molecule. Veech answered, "I could explain this to you in a number of ways, but what you've got there, boys, is a soccer ball."

Veech is the author of A Second Course in Complex Analysis (W. A. Benjamin, 1967; Dover, 2008, ISBN 9780486462943).

== Awards and honors ==
In 2012, Veech became one of the inaugural fellows of the American Mathematical Society.
