= Ornstein isomorphism theorem =

In mathematics, the Ornstein isomorphism theorem is a deep result in ergodic theory. It states that if two Bernoulli schemes have the same Kolmogorov entropy, then they are isomorphic. The result, given by Donald Ornstein in 1970, is important because it states that many systems previously believed to be unrelated are in fact isomorphic; these include many finite stationary stochastic processes, including Markov chains and subshifts of finite type, Anosov flows and Sinai's billiards, ergodic automorphisms of the n-torus, and the continued fraction transform.

== Discussion ==
The theorem is actually a collection of related theorems. The first theorem states that if two different Bernoulli shifts have the same Kolmogorov entropy, then they are isomorphic as dynamical systems. The third theorem extends this result to flows: namely, that there exists a flow $T_t$ such that $T_1$ is a Bernoulli shift. The fourth theorem states that, for a given fixed entropy, this flow is unique, up to a constant rescaling of time. The fifth theorem states that there is a single, unique flow (up to a constant rescaling of time) that has infinite entropy. The phrase "up to a constant rescaling of time" means simply that if $T_t$ and $S_t$ are two Bernoulli flows with the same entropy, then $S_t = T_{ct}$ for some constant c. The developments also included proofs that factors of Bernoulli shifts are isomorphic to Bernoulli shifts, and gave criteria for a given measure-preserving dynamical system to be isomorphic to a Bernoulli shift.

A corollary of these results is a solution to the root problem for Bernoulli shifts: So, for example, given a shift T, there is another shift $\sqrt{T}$ that is isomorphic to it.

== History ==
The question of isomorphism dates to von Neumann, who asked if the two Bernoulli schemes BS(1/2, 1/2) and BS(1/3, 1/3, 1/3) were isomorphic or not. In 1959, Ya. Sinai and Kolmogorov replied in the negative, showing that two different schemes cannot be isomorphic if they do not have the same entropy. Specifically, they showed that the entropy of a Bernoulli scheme BS(p_{1}, p_{2},..., p_{n}) is given by

$$H = -\sum_{i=1}^N p_i \log p_i .$$

The Ornstein isomorphism theorem, proved by Donald Ornstein in 1970, states that two Bernoulli schemes with the same entropy are isomorphic. The result is sharp, in that very similar, non-scheme systems do not have this property; specifically, there exist Kolmogorov systems with the same entropy that are not isomorphic. Ornstein received the Bôcher prize for this work.

A simplified proof of the isomorphism theorem for symbolic Bernoulli schemes was given by Michael S. Keane and M. Smorodinsky in 1979.
