= Lebesgue space =

Lebesgue space may refer to:

- L^{p} space, a special Banach space of functions (or rather, equivalence classes of functions)
- Standard probability space, a non-pathological probability space
