= Interval exchange transformation =

Graph of interval exchange transformation (in black) with $\lambda = (1/15,2/15,3/15,4/15,5/15)$ and $\pi=(3,5,2,4,1)$. In blue, the orbit generated starting from $1/2$.

In mathematics, an interval exchange transformation is a kind of dynamical system that generalises circle rotation. The phase space consists of the unit interval, and the transformation acts by cutting the interval into several subintervals, and then permuting these subintervals. They arise naturally in the study of polygonal billiards and in area-preserving flows.

== Formal definition ==
Let $n > 0$ and let $\pi$ be a permutation on $1, \dots, n$. Consider a vector $\lambda = (\lambda_1, \dots, \lambda_n)$ of positive real numbers (the widths of the subintervals), satisfying

$$\sum_{i=1}^n \lambda_i = 1.$$

Define a map $T_{\pi,\lambda}:[0,1]\rightarrow [0,1],$ called the interval exchange transformation associated with the pair $(\pi,\lambda)$ as follows. For $1 \leq i \leq n$ let

$$a_i = \sum_{1 \leq j < i} \lambda_j \quad \text{and} \quad a'_i = \sum_{1 \leq j < \pi(i)} \lambda_{\pi^{-1}(j)}.$$

Then for $x \in [0,1]$, define

$$T_{\pi,\lambda}(x) = x - a_i + a'_i$$

if $x$ lies in the subinterval $[a_i,a_i+\lambda_i)$. Thus $T_{\pi,\lambda}$ acts on each subinterval of the form $[a_i,a_i+\lambda_i)$ by a translation, and it rearranges these subintervals so that the subinterval at position $i$ is moved to position $\pi(i)$.

== Properties ==
Any interval exchange transformation $T_{\pi,\lambda}$ is a bijection of $[0,1]$ to itself that preserves the Lebesgue measure. It is continuous except at a finite number of points.

The inverse of the interval exchange transformation $T_{\pi,\lambda}$ is again an interval exchange transformation. In fact, it is the transformation $T_{\pi^{-1}, \lambda'}$ where $\lambda'_i = \lambda_{\pi^{-1}(i)}$ for all $1 \leq i \leq n$.

If $n=2$ and $\pi = (12)$ (in cycle notation), and if we join up the ends of the interval to make a circle, then $T_{\pi,\lambda}$ is just a circle rotation. The Weyl equidistribution theorem then asserts that if the length $\lambda_1$ is irrational, then $T_{\pi,\lambda}$ is uniquely ergodic. Roughly speaking, this means that the orbits of points of $[0,1]$ are uniformly evenly distributed. On the other hand, if $\lambda_1$ is rational then each point of the interval is periodic, and the period is the denominator of $\lambda_1$ (written in lowest terms).

If $n>2$, and provided $\pi$ satisfies certain non-degeneracy conditions (namely there is no integer $0 < k < n$ such that $\pi(\{1,\dots,k\}) = \{1,\dots,k\}$), a deep theorem which was a conjecture of M.Keane and due independently to William A. Veech and to Howard Masur asserts that for almost all choices of $\lambda$ in the unit simplex $\{(t_1, \dots, t_n) : \sum t_i = 1\}$ the interval exchange transformation $T_{\pi,\lambda}$ is again uniquely ergodic. However, for $n \geq 4$ there also exist choices of $(\pi,\lambda)$ so that $T_{\pi,\lambda}$ is ergodic but not uniquely ergodic. Even in these cases, the number of ergodic invariant measures of $T_{\pi,\lambda}$ is finite, and is at most $n$.

Interval maps have a topological entropy of zero.

== Odometers ==
Dyadic odometer $T$

Dyadic odometer iterated twice; that is $T^2.$

Dyadic odometer thrice iterated; that is $T^3.$

Dyadic odometer iterated four times; that is $T^4.$

The dyadic odometer can be understood as an interval exchange transformation of a countable number of intervals. The dyadic odometer is most easily written as the transformation

$$T\left(1,\dots,1,0,b_{k+1},b_{k+2},\dots\right) = \left(0,\dots,0,1,b_{k+1},b_{k+2},\dots \right)$$

defined on the Cantor space $\{0,1\}^\mathbb{N}.$ The standard mapping from Cantor space into the unit interval is given by

$$(b_0,b_1,b_2,\cdots)\mapsto x=\sum_{n=0}^\infty b_n2^{-n-1}$$

This mapping is a measure-preserving homomorphism from the Cantor set to the unit interval, in that it maps the standard Bernoulli measure on the Cantor set to the Lebesgue measure on the unit interval. A visualization of the odometer and its first three iterates appear on the right.

== Higher dimensions ==
Two and higher-dimensional generalizations include polygon exchanges, polyhedral exchanges and piecewise isometries.

== See also ==
- Odometer
