= Standard probability space =

Type of probability space

In probability theory, a standard probability space, also called Lebesgue–Rokhlin probability space or just Lebesgue space (the latter term is ambiguous) is a probability space satisfying certain assumptions introduced by Vladimir Rokhlin in 1940. Informally, it is a probability space consisting of an interval and/or a finite or countable number of atoms.

The theory of standard probability spaces was started by von Neumann in 1932 and shaped by Vladimir Rokhlin in 1940. Rokhlin showed that the unit interval endowed with the Lebesgue measure has important advantages over general probability spaces, yet can be effectively substituted for many of these in probability theory. The dimension of the unit interval is not an obstacle, as was clear already to Norbert Wiener. He constructed the Wiener process (also called Brownian motion) in the form of a measurable map from the unit interval to the space of continuous functions.

== Short history ==
The theory of standard probability spaces was started by von Neumann in 1932 and shaped by Vladimir Rokhlin in 1940. For modernized presentations see (Haezendonck 1973), (de la Rue 1993), (Itô 1984, Sect. 2.4) and (Rudolph 1990, Chapter 2).

Nowadays standard probability spaces may be (and often are) treated in the framework of descriptive set theory, via standard Borel spaces, see for example (Kechris 1995, Sect. 17). This approach is based on the isomorphism theorem for standard Borel spaces (Kechris 1995, Theorem (15.6)). An alternate approach of Rokhlin, based on measure theory, neglects null sets, in contrast to descriptive set theory. Standard probability spaces are used routinely in ergodic theory.

== Definition ==
One of several well-known equivalent definitions of the standardness is given below, after some preparations. All probability spaces are assumed to be complete.

=== Isomorphism ===
An isomorphism between two probability spaces $\textstyle (\Omega_1,\mathcal{F}_1,P_1)$, $\textstyle (\Omega_2,\mathcal{F}_2,P_2)$ is an invertible map $\textstyle f : \Omega_1 \to \Omega_2$ such that $\textstyle f$ and $\textstyle f^{-1}$ both are (measurable and) measure preserving maps.

Two probability spaces are isomorphic if there exists an isomorphism between them.

=== Isomorphism modulo zero ===
Two probability spaces $\textstyle (\Omega_1,\mathcal{F}_1,P_1)$, $\textstyle (\Omega_2,\mathcal{F}_2,P_2)$ are isomorphic $\textstyle \operatorname{mod} \, 0$ if there exist null sets $\textstyle A_1 \subset \Omega_1$, $\textstyle A_2 \subset \Omega_2$ such that the probability spaces $\textstyle \Omega_1 \setminus A_1$, $\textstyle \Omega_2 \setminus A_2$ are isomorphic (being endowed naturally with sigma-fields and probability measures).

=== Standard probability space ===
A probability space is standard, if it is isomorphic $\textstyle \operatorname{mod} \, 0$ to an interval with Lebesgue measure, a finite or countable set of atoms, or a combination (disjoint union) of both.

See (Rokhlin 1952, Sect. 2.4 (p. 20)), (Haezendonck 1973, Proposition 6 (p. 249) and Remark 2 (p. 250)), and (de la Rue 1993, Theorem 4-3). See also (Kechris 1995, Sect. 17.F), and (Itô 1984, especially Sect. 2.4 and Exercise 3.1(v)). In (Petersen 1983, Definition 4.5 on page 16) the measure is assumed finite, not necessarily probabilistic. In (Sinai 1994, Definition 1 on page 16) atoms are not allowed.

== Examples of non-standard probability spaces ==
=== A naive white noise ===
The space of all functions $\textstyle f : \mathbb{R} \to \mathbb{R}$ may be thought of as the product $\textstyle \mathbb{R}^\mathbb{R}$ of a continuum of copies of the real line $\textstyle \mathbb{R}$. One may endow $\textstyle \mathbb{R}$ with a probability measure, say, the standard normal distribution $\textstyle \gamma = N(0,1)$, and treat the space of functions as the product $\textstyle (\mathbb{R},\gamma)^\mathbb{R}$ of a continuum of identical probability spaces $\textstyle (\mathbb{R},\gamma)$. The product measure $\textstyle \gamma^\mathbb{R}$ is a probability measure on $\textstyle \mathbb{R}^\mathbb{R}$. Naively it might seem that $\textstyle \gamma^\mathbb{R}$ describes white noise.

However, the integral of a white noise function from 0 to 1 should be a random variable distributed N(0, 1). In contrast, the integral (from 0 to 1) of $\textstyle f \in \textstyle (\mathbb{R},\gamma)^\mathbb{R}$ is undefined. ƒ also fails to be almost surely measurable, and the probability of ƒ being measurable is undefined. Indeed, if X is a random variable distributed (say) uniformly on (0, 1) and independent of ƒ, then ƒ(X) is not a random variable at all (it lacks measurability).

=== A perforated interval ===
Let $\textstyle Z \subset (0,1)$ be a set whose inner Lebesgue measure is equal to 0, but outer Lebesgue measure is equal to 1 (thus, $\textstyle Z$ is nonmeasurable to extreme). There exists a probability measure $\textstyle m$ on $\textstyle Z$ such that $\textstyle m(Z \cap A) = \operatorname{mes} (A)$ for every Lebesgue measurable $\textstyle A \subset (0,1)$. (Here $\textstyle \operatorname{mes}$ is the Lebesgue measure.) Events and random variables on the probability space $\textstyle (Z,m)$ (treated $\textstyle \operatorname{mod} \, 0$) are in a natural one-to-one correspondence with events and random variables on the probability space $\textstyle ((0,1),\operatorname{mes})$. It might seem that the probability space $\textstyle (Z,m)$ is as good as $\textstyle ((0,1),\operatorname{mes})$.

However, it is not. A random variable $\textstyle X$ defined by $\textstyle X(\omega)=\omega$ is distributed uniformly on $\textstyle (0,1)$. The conditional measure, given $\textstyle X=x$, is just a single atom (at $\textstyle x$), provided that $\textstyle ((0,1),\operatorname{mes})$ is the underlying probability space. However, if $\textstyle (Z,m)$ is used instead, then the conditional measure does not exist when $\textstyle x \notin Z$.

A perforated circle is constructed similarly. Its events and random variables are the same as on the usual circle. The group of rotations acts on them naturally. However, it fails to act on the perforated circle.

See also (Rudolph 1990, page 17).

=== A superfluous measurable set ===
Let $\textstyle Z \subset (0,1)$ be as in the previous example. Sets of the form $\textstyle ( A \cap Z ) \cup ( B \setminus Z ),$ where $\textstyle A$ and $\textstyle B$ are arbitrary Lebesgue measurable sets, are a σ-algebra $\textstyle \mathcal{F};$ it contains the Lebesgue σ-algebra and $\textstyle Z.$ The formula

$$\displaystyle m \big( ( A \cap Z ) \cup ( B \setminus Z ) \big) = p \, \operatorname{mes} (A) + (1-p) \operatorname{mes} (B)$$

gives the general form of a probability measure $\textstyle m$ on $\textstyle \big( (0,1), \mathcal{F} \big)$ that extends the Lebesgue measure; here $\textstyle p \in [0,1]$ is a parameter. To be specific, we choose $\textstyle p = 0.5.$ It might seem that such an extension of the Lebesgue measure is at least harmless.

However, it is the perforated interval in disguise. The map

$$f(x) = \begin{cases}
0.5 x &\text{for } x \in Z, \\
0.5 + 0.5 x &\text{for } x \in (0,1) \setminus Z
\end{cases}$$

is an isomorphism between $\textstyle \big( (0,1), \mathcal{F}, m \big)$ and the perforated interval corresponding to the set

$$\displaystyle Z_1 = \{ 0.5 x : x \in Z \} \cup \{ 0.5 + 0.5 x : x \in (0,1) \setminus Z \} \, ,$$

another set of inner Lebesgue measure 0 but outer Lebesgue measure 1.

See also (Rudolph 1990, Exercise 2.11 on page 18).

== A criterion of standardness ==
Standardness of a given probability space $\textstyle (\Omega,\mathcal{F},P)$ is equivalent to a certain property of a measurable map $\textstyle f$ from $\textstyle (\Omega,\mathcal{F},P)$ to a measurable space $\textstyle (X,\Sigma).$ The answer (standard, or not) does not depend on the choice of $\textstyle (X,\Sigma)$ and $\textstyle f$. This fact is quite useful; one may adapt the choice of $\textstyle (X,\Sigma)$ and $\textstyle f$ to the given $\textstyle (\Omega,\mathcal{F},P).$ No need to examine all cases. It may be convenient to examine a random variable $\textstyle f : \Omega \to \mathbb{R},$ a random vector $\textstyle f : \Omega \to \mathbb{R}^n,$ a random sequence $\textstyle f : \Omega \to \mathbb{R}^\infty,$ or a sequence of events $\textstyle (A_1,A_2,\dots)$ treated as a sequence of two-valued random variables, $\textstyle f : \Omega \to \{0,1\}^\infty.$

Two conditions will be imposed on $\textstyle f$ (to be injective, and generating). Below it is assumed that such $\textstyle f$ is given. The question of its existence will be addressed afterwards.

The probability space $\textstyle (\Omega,\mathcal{F},P)$ is assumed to be complete (otherwise it cannot be standard).

=== A single random variable ===
A measurable function $\textstyle f : \Omega \to \mathbb{R}$ induces a pushforward measure $f_*P$, – the probability measure $\textstyle \mu$ on $\textstyle \mathbb{R},$ defined by

$\displaystyle \mu(B) = (f_*P)(B) = P \big( f^{-1}(B) \big)$ for Borel sets $\textstyle B \subset \mathbb{R}.$

i.e. the distribution of the random variable $f$. The image $\textstyle f (\Omega)$ is always a set of full outer measure,

$$\displaystyle \mu^* \big( f(\Omega) \big) = \inf_{B \supset f(\Omega)}\mu(B) = \inf_{B \supset f(\Omega)}P(f^{-1}(B)) = P(\Omega) = 1,$$

but its inner measure can differ (see a perforated interval). In other words, $\textstyle f (\Omega)$ need not be a set of full measure $\textstyle \mu.$

A measurable function $\textstyle f : \Omega \to \mathbb{R}$ is called generating if $\textstyle \mathcal{F}$ is the completion with respect to $P$ of the σ-algebra of inverse images $\textstyle f^{-1}(B),$ where $\textstyle B \subset \mathbb{R}$ runs over all Borel sets.

Caution. The following condition is not sufficient for $\textstyle f$ to be generating: for every $\textstyle A \in \mathcal{F}$ there exists a Borel set $\textstyle B \subset \mathbb{R}$ such that $\textstyle P ( A \mathbin{\Delta} f^{-1}(B) ) = 0.$ ($\textstyle \Delta$ means symmetric difference).

Theorem. Let a measurable function $\textstyle f : \Omega \to \mathbb{R}$ be injective and generating, then the following two conditions are equivalent:

- $\mu(\textstyle f (\Omega)) = 1$ (i.e. the inner measure has also full measure, and the image $\textstyle f (\Omega)$ is measureable with respect to the completion);
- $(\Omega,\mathcal{F},P) \,$ is a standard probability space.

See also (Itô 1984, Sect. 3.1).

=== A random vector ===
The same theorem holds for any $\mathbb{R}^n \,$ (in place of $\mathbb{R} \,$). A measurable function $f : \Omega \to \mathbb{R}^n \,$ may be thought of as a finite sequence of random variables $X_1,\dots,X_n : \Omega \to \mathbb{R}, \,$ and $f \,$ is generating if and only if $\mathcal{F} \,$ is the completion of the σ-algebra generated by $X_1,\dots,X_n. \,$

=== A random sequence ===
The theorem still holds for the space $\mathbb{R}^\infty \,$ of infinite sequences. A measurable function $f : \Omega \to \mathbb{R}^\infty \,$ may be thought of as an infinite sequence of random variables $X_1,X_2,\dots : \Omega \to \mathbb{R}, \,$ and $f \,$ is generating if and only if $\mathcal{F} \,$ is the completion of the σ-algebra generated by $X_1,X_2,\dots. \,$

=== A sequence of events ===
In particular, if the random variables $X_n \,$ take on only two values 0 and 1, we deal with a measurable function $f : \Omega \to \{0,1\}^\infty \,$ and a sequence of sets $A_1,A_2,\ldots \in \mathcal{F}. \,$ The function $f \,$ is generating if and only if $\mathcal{F} \,$ is the completion of the σ-algebra generated by $A_1,A_2,\dots. \,$

In the pioneering work (Rokhlin 1952) sequences $A_1,A_2,\ldots \,$ that correspond to injective, generating $f \,$ are called bases of the probability space $(\Omega,\mathcal{F},P) \,$ (see Rokhlin 1952, Sect. 2.1). A basis is called complete mod 0, if $f(\Omega) \,$ is of full measure $\mu, \,$ see (Rokhlin 1952, Sect. 2.2). In the same section Rokhlin proved that if a probability space is complete mod 0 with respect to some basis, then it is complete mod 0 with respect to every other basis, and defines Lebesgue spaces by this completeness property. See also (Haezendonck 1973, Prop. 4 and Def. 7) and (Rudolph 1990, Sect. 2.3, especially Theorem 2.2).

=== Additional remarks ===
The four cases treated above are mutually equivalent, and can be united, since the measurable spaces $\mathbb{R}, \,$ $\mathbb{R}^n, \,$ $\mathbb{R}^\infty \,$ and $\{0,1\}^\infty \,$ are mutually isomorphic; they all are standard measurable spaces (in other words, standard Borel spaces).

Existence of an injective measurable function from $\textstyle (\Omega,\mathcal{F},P)$ to a standard measurable space $\textstyle (X,\Sigma)$ does not depend on the choice of $\textstyle (X,\Sigma).$ Taking $\textstyle (X,\Sigma) = \{0,1\}^\infty$ we get the property well known as being countably separated (but called separable in Itô 1984).

Existence of a generating measurable function from $\textstyle (\Omega,\mathcal{F},P)$ to a standard measurable space $\textstyle (X,\Sigma)$ also does not depend on the choice of $\textstyle (X,\Sigma).$ Taking $\textstyle (X,\Sigma) = \{0,1\}^\infty$ we get the property well known as being countably generated (mod 0), see (Durrett 1996, Exer. I.5).

Probability space	Countably separated	Countably generated	Standard
Interval with Lebesgue measure	Yes	Yes	Yes
Naive white noise	No	No	No
Perforated interval	Yes	Yes	No

Every injective measurable function from a standard probability space to a standard measurable space is generating. See (Rokhlin 1952, Sect. 2.5), (Haezendonck 1973, Corollary 2 on page 253), (de la Rue 1993, Theorems 3-4 and 3-5). This property does not hold for the non-standard probability space dealt with in the subsection "A superfluous measurable set" above.

Caution. The property of being countably generated is invariant under mod 0 isomorphisms, but the property of being countably separated is not. In fact, a standard probability space $\textstyle (\Omega,\mathcal{F},P)$ is countably separated if and only if the cardinality of $\textstyle \Omega$ does not exceed continuum (see Itô 1984, Exer. 3.1(v)). A standard probability space may contain a null set of any cardinality, thus, it need not be countably separated. However, it always contains a countably separated subset of full measure.

== Equivalent definitions ==
Let $\textstyle (\Omega,\mathcal{F},P)$ be a complete probability space such that the cardinality of $\textstyle \Omega$ does not exceed continuum (the general case is reduced to this special case, see the caution above).

=== Via absolute measurability ===
Definition. $\textstyle (\Omega,\mathcal{F},P)$ is standard if it is countably separated, countably generated, and absolutely measurable.

See (Rokhlin 1952, the end of Sect. 2.3) and (Haezendonck 1973, Remark 2 on page 248). "Absolutely measurable" means: measurable in every countably separated, countably generated probability space containing it.

=== Via perfectness ===
Definition. $\textstyle (\Omega,\mathcal{F},P)$ is standard if it is countably separated and perfect.

See (Itô 1984, Sect. 3.1). "Perfect" means that for every measurable function from $\textstyle (\Omega,\mathcal{F},P)$ to $\mathbb{R} \,$ the image measure is regular. (Here the image measure is defined on all sets whose inverse images belong to $\textstyle \mathcal{F}$, irrespective of the Borel structure of $\mathbb{R} \,$).

=== Via topology ===
Definition. $\textstyle (\Omega,\mathcal{F},P)$ is standard if there exists a topology $\textstyle \tau$ on $\textstyle \Omega$ such that

- the topological space $\textstyle (\Omega,\tau)$ is metrizable;
- $\textstyle \mathcal{F}$ is the completion of the σ-algebra generated by $\textstyle \tau$ (that is, by all open sets);
- for every $\textstyle \varepsilon > 0$ there exists a compact set $\textstyle K$ in $\textstyle (\Omega,\tau)$ such that $\textstyle P(K) \ge 1-\varepsilon.$

See (de la Rue 1993, Sect. 1).

== Verifying the standardness ==
Every probability distribution on the space $\textstyle \mathbb{R}^n$ turns it into a standard probability space. (Here, a probability distribution means a probability measure defined initially on the Borel sigma-algebra and completed.)

The same holds on every Polish space, see (Rokhlin 1952, Sect. 2.7 (p. 24)), (Haezendonck 1973, Example 1 (p. 248)), (de la Rue 1993, Theorem 2-3), and (Itô 1984, Theorem 2.4.1).

For example, the Wiener measure turns the Polish space $\textstyle C[0,\infty)$ (of all continuous functions $\textstyle [0,\infty) \to \mathbb{R},$ endowed with the topology of local uniform convergence) into a standard probability space.

Another example: for every sequence of random variables, their joint distribution turns the Polish space $\textstyle \mathbb{R}^\infty$ (of sequences; endowed with the product topology) into a standard probability space.

(Thus, the idea of dimension, very natural for topological spaces, is utterly inappropriate for standard probability spaces.)

The product of two standard probability spaces is a standard probability space.

The same holds for the product of countably many spaces, see (Rokhlin 1952, Sect. 3.4), (Haezendonck 1973, Proposition 12), and (Itô 1984, Theorem 2.4.3).

A measurable subset of a standard probability space is a standard probability space. It is assumed that the set is not a null set, and is endowed with the conditional measure. See (Rokhlin 1952, Sect. 2.3 (p. 14)) and (Haezendonck 1973, Proposition 5).

Every probability measure on a standard Borel space turns it into a standard probability space.

== Applications ==
=== Regular conditional probabilities ===
In the discrete setup, the conditional probability is another probability measure, and the conditional expectation may be treated as the (usual) expectation with respect to the conditional measure, see conditional expectation. In the non-discrete setup, conditioning is often treated indirectly, since the condition may have probability 0, see conditional expectation. As a result, a number of well-known facts have special 'conditional' counterparts. For example: linearity of the expectation; Jensen's inequality (see conditional expectation); Hölder's inequality; the monotone convergence theorem, etc.

Given a random variable $\textstyle Y$ on a probability space $\textstyle (\Omega,\mathcal{F},P)$, it is natural to try constructing a conditional measure $\textstyle P_y$, that is, the conditional distribution of $\textstyle \omega \in \Omega$ given $\textstyle Y(\omega)=y$. In general this is impossible (see Durrett 1996, Sect. 4.1(c)). However, for a standard probability space $\textstyle (\Omega,\mathcal{F},P)$ this is possible, and well known as canonical system of measures (see Rokhlin 1952, Sect. 3.1), which is basically the same as conditional probability measures (see Itô 1984, Sect. 3.5), disintegration of measure (see Kechris 1995, Exercise (17.35)), and regular conditional probabilities (see Durrett 1996, Sect. 4.1(c)).

The conditional Jensen's inequality is just the (usual) Jensen's inequality applied to the conditional measure. The same holds for many other facts.

=== Measure preserving transformations ===
Given two probability spaces $\textstyle (\Omega_1,\mathcal{F}_1,P_1)$, $\textstyle (\Omega_2,\mathcal{F}_2,P_2)$ and a measure preserving map $\textstyle f : \Omega_1 \to \Omega_2$, the image $\textstyle f(\Omega_1)$ need not cover the whole $\textstyle \Omega_2$, it may miss a null set. It may seem that $\textstyle P_2(f(\Omega_1))$ has to be equal to 1, but it is not so. The outer measure of $\textstyle f(\Omega_1)$ is equal to 1, but the inner measure may differ. However, if the probability spaces $\textstyle (\Omega_1,\mathcal{F}_1,P_1)$, $\textstyle (\Omega_2,\mathcal{F}_2,P_2)$ are standard then $\textstyle P_2(f(\Omega_1))=1$, see (de la Rue 1993, Theorem 3-2). If $\textstyle f$ is also one-to-one then every $\textstyle A \in \mathcal{F}_1$ satisfies $\textstyle f(A) \in \mathcal{F}_2$, $\textstyle P_2(f(A))=P_1(A)$. Therefore, $\textstyle f^{-1}$ is measurable (and measure preserving). See (Rokhlin 1952, Sect. 2.5 (p. 20)) and (de la Rue 1993, Theorem 3-5). See also (Haezendonck 1973, Proposition 9 (and Remark after it)).

"There is a coherent way to ignore the sets of measure 0 in a measure space" (Petersen 1983, page 15). Striving to get rid of null sets, mathematicians often use equivalence classes of measurable sets or functions. Equivalence classes of measurable subsets of a probability space form a normed complete Boolean algebra called the measure algebra (or metric structure). Every measure preserving map $\textstyle f : \Omega_1 \to \Omega_2$ leads to a homomorphism $\textstyle F$ of measure algebras; basically, $\textstyle F(B) = f^{-1}(B)$ for $\textstyle B\in\mathcal{F}_2$.

It may seem that every homomorphism of measure algebras has to correspond to some measure preserving map, but it is not so. However, for standard probability spaces each $\textstyle F$ corresponds to some $\textstyle f$. See (Rokhlin 1952, Sect. 2.6 (p. 23) and 3.2), (Kechris 1995, Sect. 17.F), (Petersen 1983, Theorem 4.7 on page 17).

== See also ==
"Standard probability space", Encyclopedia of Mathematics, EMS Press, 2001 [1994]
