= Piecewise isometry =

In mathematics, a piecewise isometry is a dynamical system that consists of finitely many Euclidean isometries acting in different places, including rotations, translations, and reflections. Piecewise isometries are higher-dimensional generalizations of interval exchange transformations; the theory has applications in outer billiards, digital filters, and granular mixing.
