= Kakutani's theorem (measure theory) =

In measure theory, a branch of mathematics, Kakutani's theorem is a fundamental result on the equivalence or mutual singularity of countable product measures. It gives an "if and only if" characterisation of when two such measures are equivalent, and hence it is extremely useful when trying to establish change-of-measure formulae for measures on function spaces. The result is due to the Japanese mathematician Shizuo Kakutani. Kakutani's theorem can be used, for example, to determine whether a translate of a Gaussian measure $\mu$ is equivalent to $\mu$ (only when the translation vector lies in the Cameron–Martin space of $\mu$), or whether a dilation of $\mu$ is equivalent to $\mu$ (only when the absolute value of the dilation factor is 1, which is part of the Feldman–Hájek theorem).

== Statement of the theorem ==
For each $n \in \mathbb{N}$, let $\mu_{n}$ and $\nu_{n}$ be measures on the real line $\mathbb{R}$, and let $\mu = \bigotimes_{n \in \mathbb{N}} \mu_n$ and $\nu = \bigotimes_{n \in \mathbb{N}} \nu_n$ be the corresponding product measures on $\mathbb{R}^\infty$. Suppose also that, for each $n \in \mathbb{N}$, $\mu_n$ and $\nu_n$ are equivalent (i.e. have the same null sets). Then either $\mu$ and $\nu$ are equivalent, or else they are mutually singular. Furthermore, equivalence holds precisely when the infinite product

$$\prod_{n \in \mathbb{N}} \int_{\mathbb{R}} \sqrt{ \frac{\mathrm{d} \mu_n} {\mathrm{d} \nu_n} } \, \mathrm{d} \nu_n$$

has a nonzero limit; or, equivalently, when the infinite series

$$\sum_{n \in \mathbb{N}} \log \int_{\mathbb{R}} \sqrt{ \frac{\mathrm{d} \mu_n}{\mathrm{d} \nu_n} } \, \mathrm{d} \nu_n$$

converges.
