= Baker's map =

Chaotic map from the unit square into itself

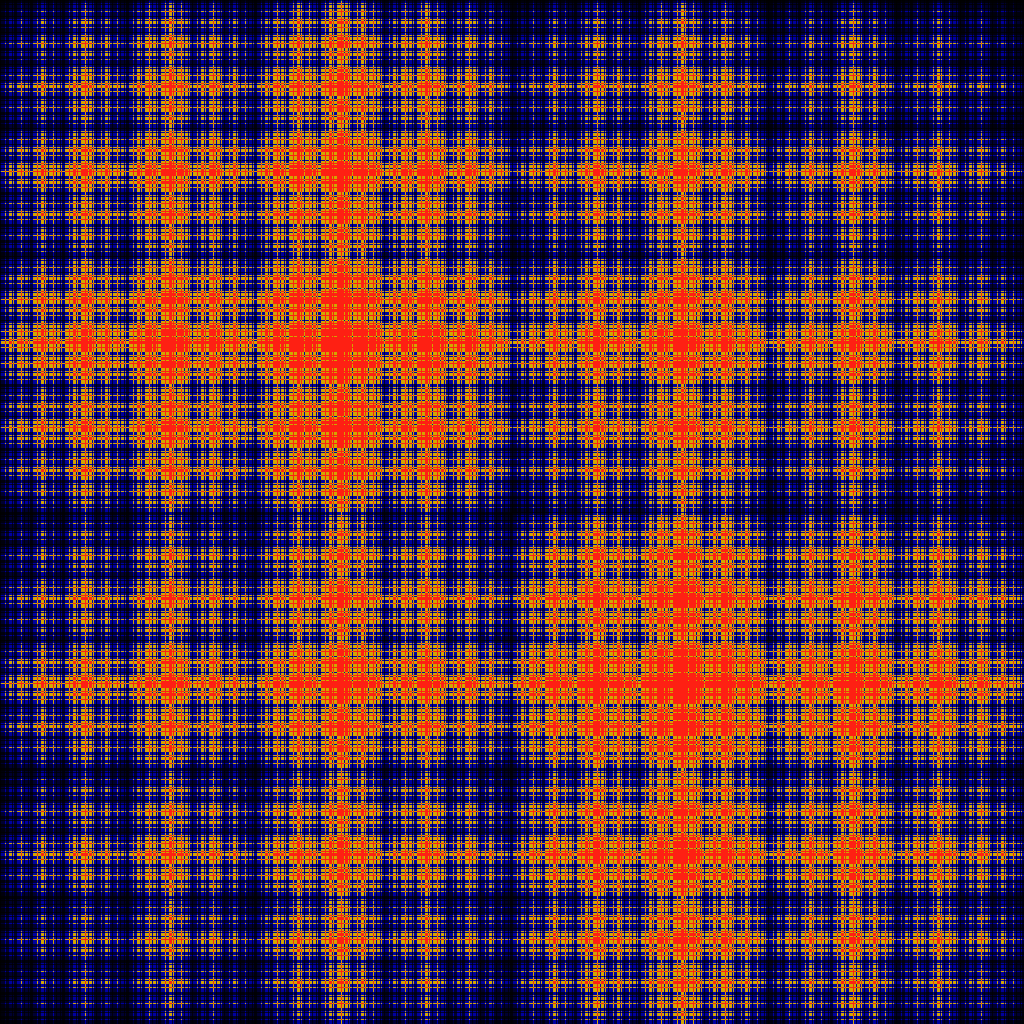
Example of a measure that is invariant under the action of the (unrotated) baker's map: an invariant measure. Applying the baker's map to this image always results in exactly the same image.

In dynamical systems theory, the baker's map is a chaotic map from the unit square into itself. It is named after a kneading operation that bakers apply to dough: the dough is cut in half, and the two halves are stacked on one another, and compressed.

The baker's map can be understood as the bilateral shift operator of a bi-infinite two-state lattice model. The baker's map is topologically conjugate to the horseshoe map. In physics, a chain of coupled baker's maps can be used to model deterministic diffusion.

As with many deterministic dynamical systems, the baker's map is studied by its action on the space of functions defined on the unit square. The baker's map defines an operator on the space of functions, known as the transfer operator of the map. The baker's map is an exactly solvable model of deterministic chaos, in that the eigenfunctions and eigenvalues of the transfer operator can be explicitly determined.

== Formal definition ==
There are two alternative definitions of the baker's map which are in common use. One definition folds over or rotates one of the sliced halves before joining it (similar to the horseshoe map) and the other does not.

The folded baker's map acts on the unit square as

$$S_\text{baker-folded}(x, y) = \begin{cases}
(2x, \frac{y}{2})   & \text{for } 0 \le x < \frac{1}{2} \\
(2-2x, 1-\frac{y}{2}) & \text{for } \frac{1}{2} \le x < 1.
\end{cases}$$

When the upper section is not folded over, the map may be written as

$$S_\text{baker-unfolded}(x,y)=
\left(2x - \left\lfloor 2x \right\rfloor,\ \frac{ y + \left\lfloor 2x\right\rfloor }{2}\right).$$

The folded baker's map is a two-dimensional analog of the tent map

$$S_\mathrm{tent}(x) = \begin{cases}
2x  & \text{for } 0 \le x < \frac{1}{2} \\
2(1-x) & \text{for } \frac{1}{2} \le x < 1
\end{cases}$$

while the unfolded map is analogous to the Bernoulli map. Both maps are topologically conjugate. The Bernoulli map can be understood as the map that progressively lops digits off the dyadic expansion of x. Unlike the tent map, the baker's map is invertible.

== Properties ==
The baker's map preserves the two-dimensional Lebesgue measure.

Repeated application of the baker's map to points colored red and blue, initially separated. After several iterations, the red and blue points seem to be completely mixed.

The map is strong mixing and it is topologically mixing.

The transfer operator $U$ maps functions on the unit square to other functions on the unit square; it is given by

$$\left[Uf\right](x,y) = (f\circ S^{-1}) (x,y).$$

The origin unit square is on top and the bottom shows the result as the square is swept from left to right.

The transfer operator is unitary on the Hilbert space of square-integrable functions on the unit square. The spectrum is continuous, and because the operator is unitary the eigenvalues lie on the unit circle. The transfer operator is not unitary on the space $\mathcal{P}_x\otimes L^2_y$ of functions polynomial in the first coordinate and square-integrable in the second. On this space, it has a discrete, non-unitary, decaying spectrum.

== As a shift operator ==
The baker's map can be understood as the two-sided shift operator on the symbolic dynamics of a one-dimensional lattice. Consider, for example, the bi-infinite string

$$\sigma = \left(\ldots,\sigma_{-2},\sigma_{-1},\sigma_{0},\sigma_{1},\sigma_{2},\ldots \right)$$

where each position in the string may take one of the two binary values $\sigma_k \in \{0,1\}$. The action of the shift operator on this string is

$$\tau(\ldots,\sigma_{k},\sigma_{k+1},\sigma_{k+2},\ldots) = (\ldots,\sigma_{k-1},\sigma_{k},\sigma_{k+1},\ldots)$$

that is, each lattice position is shifted over by one to the left. The bi-infinite string may be represented by two real numbers $0\le x,y\le 1$ as

$$x(\sigma)=\sum_{k=0}^\infty \sigma_{-k} 2^{-(k+1)}$$

and

$$y(\sigma)=\sum_{k=0}^\infty \sigma_{k+1} 2^{-(k+1)}.$$

In this representation, the shift operator has the form

$$\tau(x,y) = \left(2x - \left\lfloor 2x \right\rfloor,\ \frac{ y + \left\lfloor 2x\right\rfloor }{2}\right)$$

which is seen to be the unfolded baker's map given above.

== See also ==
- Bernoulli process
