= Transfer operator =

Operator encoding information about iterated map

In mathematics, the transfer operator encodes information about an iterated map and is frequently used to study the behavior of dynamical systems, statistical mechanics, quantum chaos and fractals. In all usual cases, the largest eigenvalue is 1, and the corresponding eigenvector is the invariant measure of the system.

The transfer operator is sometimes called the Ruelle operator, after David Ruelle, or the Perron–Frobenius operator or Ruelle–Perron–Frobenius operator, in reference to the applicability of the Perron–Frobenius theorem to the determination of the eigenvalues of the operator.

== Definition ==
The iterated function to be studied is a map $f\colon X\rightarrow X$ for an arbitrary set $X$.

The transfer operator is defined as an operator $\mathcal{L}$ acting on the space of functions $\{\Phi\colon X\rightarrow \mathbb{C}\}$ as

$$(\mathcal{L}\Phi)(x) = \sum_{y\,\in\, f^{-1}(x)} g(y) \Phi(y)$$

where $g\colon X\rightarrow\mathbb{C}$ is an auxiliary valuation function. When $f$ has a Jacobian determinant $|J|$, then $g$ is usually taken to be $g=1/|J|$.

The above definition of the transfer operator can be shown to be the point-set limit of the measure-theoretic pushforward of g: in essence, the transfer operator is the direct image functor in the category of measurable spaces. The left-adjoint of the Perron–Frobenius operator is the Koopman operator or composition operator. The general setting is provided by the Borel functional calculus.

As a general rule, the transfer operator can usually be interpreted as a (left-)shift operator acting on a shift space. The most commonly studied shifts are the subshifts of finite type. The adjoint to the transfer operator can likewise usually be interpreted as a right-shift. Particularly well studied right-shifts include the Jacobi operator and the Hessenberg matrix, both of which generate systems of orthogonal polynomials via a right-shift.

== Applications ==
Whereas the iteration of a function $f$ naturally leads to a study of the orbits of points of X under iteration (the study of point dynamics), the transfer operator defines how (smooth) maps evolve under iteration. Thus, transfer operators typically appear in physics problems, such as quantum chaos and statistical mechanics, where attention is focused on the time evolution of smooth functions. In turn, this has medical applications to rational drug design, through the field of molecular dynamics.

It is often the case that the transfer operator is positive, has discrete positive real-valued eigenvalues, with the largest eigenvalue being equal to one. For this reason, the transfer operator is sometimes called the Frobenius–Perron operator.

The eigenfunctions of the transfer operator are usually fractals. When the logarithm of the transfer operator corresponds to a quantum Hamiltonian, the eigenvalues will typically be very closely spaced, and thus even a very narrow and carefully selected ensemble of quantum states will encompass a large number of very different fractal eigenstates with non-zero support over the entire volume. This can be used to explain many results from classical statistical mechanics, including the irreversibility of time and the increase of entropy.

The transfer operator of the Bernoulli map $b(x)=2x-\lfloor 2x\rfloor$ is exactly solvable and is a classic example of deterministic chaos; the discrete eigenvalues correspond to the Bernoulli polynomials. This operator also has a continuous spectrum consisting of the Hurwitz zeta function.

The transfer operator of the Gauss map $h(x)=1/x-\lfloor 1/x \rfloor$ is called the Gauss–Kuzmin–Wirsing (GKW) operator. The theory of the GKW dates back to a hypothesis by Gauss on continued fractions and is closely related to the Riemann zeta function.

== See also ==
- Bernoulli scheme
- Shift of finite type
- Krein–Rutman theorem
- Transfer-matrix method
