= John Edmund Kerrich =

English mathematician (1903–1985)

John Edmund Kerrich (1903–1985) was a mathematician noted for a series of experiments in probability which he conducted while interned in Nazi-occupied Denmark in the 1940s.

== Biography ==
John Kerrich was born in Norfolk, England, and grew up in South Africa. He was educated there and in the United Kingdom (First class Honours in Mathematics & MSc Astronomy, University of the Witwatersrand; Diploma in Actuarial Mathematics, University of Edinburgh).

He was appointed lecturer in mathematics in 1929, and senior lecturer six years later. In April 1940, while visiting in-laws in Copenhagen, Kerrich was caught up in the Nazi invasion and interned in Hald Ege, Viborg, Midtjylland. While there he conducted simple experiments using coins and ping-pong balls to demonstrate the empirical validity of a number of fundamental laws of probability.

On his release after the end of the Second World War, Kerrich published an account of his experiments in a short book entitled An Experimental Introduction to the Theory of Probability. Originally published in Denmark, the book was later reprinted by the University of Witwatersrand Press.

In 1957, Kerrich was appointed Foundation Professor of Statistics at the University of Witwatersrand and retired in 1971. He was married with two sons.

== Experiments in empirical probability ==
During his internment, Kerrich worked with fellow internee Eric Christensen. The most famous was a demonstration of Jacob Bernoulli's famous law of large numbers using a coin which they tossed 10,000 times. By recording the number of heads obtained as the trials continued, Kerrich was able to demonstrate that the proportion of heads obtained asymptotically approached the theoretical value of 50 percent (the precise number obtained was 5,067, which is 1.34 standard deviations above the mean for a "fair" coin thrown that many times).

Kerrich and Christensen also performed experiments using a "biased coin", made from a wooden disk partly coated in lead, to show that it too tended towards a stable asymptotic state with probability of approximately 70 percent.

In addition, the pair used urn problems involving drawing colored ping-pong balls from a box to demonstrate Bayes's theorem.

Until the advent of computer simulations, Kerrich's study, published in 1946, was widely cited as evidence of the asymptotic nature of probability. It is still regarded as a classic study in empirical mathematics. 2,000 of their fair coin flip results are given by the following table, with 1 representing heads and 0 representing tails.

00011101001111101000110101111000100111001000001110 00101010100100001001100010000111010100010000101101 01110100001101001010000011111011111001101100101011 01010000011000111001111101101010110100110110110110 01111100001110110001010010000010100111111011101011 10001100011000110001100110100100001000011101111000 11111110000000001101011010011111011110010010101100 11101101110010000010001100101100111110100111100010 00001001101011101010110011111011001000001101011111 11010001111110010111111001110011111111010000100000 00001111100101010111100001110111001000110100001111 11000101001111111101101110110111011010010110110011 01010011011111110010111000111101111111000001001001 01001110111011011011111100000101010101010101001001 11101101110011100000001001101010011001000100001100 10111100010011010110110111001101001010100000010000 00001011001101011011111000101100101000011100110011 11100101011010000110001001100010010001100100001001 01000011100000011101101111001110011010101101001011 01000001110110100010001110010011100001010000000010 10010001011000010010100011111101101111010101010000 01100010100000100000000010000001100100011011101010 11011000110111010110010010111000101101101010110110 00001011011101010101000011100111000110100111011101 10001101110000010011110001110100001010000111110100 00111111111111010101001001100010111100101010001111 11000110101010011010010111110000111011110110011001 11111010000011101010111101101011100001000101101001 10011010000101111101111010110011011110000010110010 00110110101111101011100101001101100100011000011000 01010011000110100111010000011001100011101011100001 11010111011110101101101111001111011100011011010000 01011110100111011001001110001111011000011110011111 01101011101110011011100011001111001011101010010010 10100011010111011000111110000011000000010011101011 10001011101000101111110111000001111111011000000010 10111111011100010000110000110001111101001110110000 00001111011100011101010001011000110111010001110111 10000010000110100000101000010101000101100010111100 00101110010111010010110010110100011000001110000111
