= Configuration space =

Configuration space may refer to:

- Configuration space (physics)
- Configuration space (mathematics), the space of arrangements of points on a topological space
- PCI configuration space, the underlying way that the Conventional PCI, PCI-X and PCI Express perform auto configuration of the cards inserted into their bus
