= Topological conjugacy =

Concept in topology

In mathematics, two functions are said to be topologically conjugate if there exists a homeomorphism that will conjugate the one into the other. Topological conjugacy, and related-but-distinct § Topological equivalence of flows, are important in the study of iterated functions and more generally dynamical systems, since, if the dynamics of one iterative function can be determined, then that for a topologically conjugate function follows trivially.

To illustrate this directly: suppose that $f$ and $g$ are iterated functions, and there exists a homeomorphism $h$ such that
$$g = h^{-1} \circ f \circ h,$$
so that $f$ and $g$ are topologically conjugate. Then one must have
$$g^n = h^{-1} \circ f^n \circ h,$$
and so the iterated systems are topologically conjugate as well. Here, $\circ$ denotes function composition.

== Definition ==
Let $f\colon X \to X$ and $g\colon Y \to Y$ be continuous functions on topological spaces $X$ and $Y$.

Then we say $f$ is topologically semiconjugate to $g$ if there exists a continuous surjection $h\colon Y \to X$ such that $h \circ g = f \circ h$.

$f$ and $g$ being topologically conjugate means, by definition, that they are topologically semiconjugate through a homeomorphism $h$. Then $h$ is called a topological conjugation between $f$ and $g$.

=== Flows ===
Similarly, $\phi$ on $X$, and $\psi$ on $Y$ are flows, with $X, Y$, and $h\colon Y\to X$ as above.

$\phi$ being topologically semiconjugate to $\psi$ means, by definition, that $h$ is a surjection such that $\phi(h(y), t) = h \circ \psi(y, t)$, for each $y\in Y$, $t\in \mathbb{R}$.

$\phi$ and $\psi$ being topologically conjugate means, by definition, that they are topologically semiconjugate and h is a homeomorphism.

== Examples ==
- The logistic map and the tent map are topologically conjugate.
- The logistic map of unit height and the Bernoulli map are topologically conjugate.
- For certain values in the parameter space, the Hénon map when restricted to its Julia set is topologically conjugate or semi-conjugate to the shift map on the space of two-sided sequences in two symbols.

== Discussion ==
Topological conjugation – unlike semiconjugation – defines an equivalence relation in the space of all continuous surjections of a topological space to itself, by declaring $f$ and $g$ to be related if they are topologically conjugate. This equivalence relation is very useful in the theory of dynamical systems, since each class contains all functions which share the same dynamics from the topological viewpoint. For example, orbits of $g$ are mapped to homeomorphic orbits of $f$ through the conjugation. Writing $g = h^{-1} \circ f \circ h$ makes this fact evident: $g^n = h^{-1} \circ f^n \circ h$. Speaking informally, topological conjugation is a "change of coordinates" in the topological sense.

However, the analogous definition for flows is somewhat restrictive. In fact, we are requiring the maps $\phi(\cdot, t)$ and $\psi(\cdot, t)$ to be topologically conjugate for each $t$, which is requiring more than simply that orbits of $\phi$ be mapped to orbits of $\psi$ homeomorphically. This motivates the definition of topological equivalence, which also partitions the set of all flows in $X$ into classes of flows sharing the same dynamics, again from the topological viewpoint.

== Topological equivalence ==
We say that two flows $\phi$ and $\psi$ are topologically equivalent, if there is a homeomorphism $h:Y \to X$, mapping orbits of $\psi$ to orbits of $\phi$ homeomorphically, and preserving orientation of the orbits. In other words, letting $\mathcal{O}$ denote an orbit, one has

$$h(\mathcal{O}(y, \psi)) = \{h \circ \psi(y, t): t \in \mathbb{R}\} = \{\phi(h(y), t): t \in \mathbb{R}\} = \mathcal{O}(h(y), \phi)$$

for each $y \in Y$. In addition, one must line up the flow of time: for each $y \in Y$, there exists a $\delta > 0$ such that, if $0 < \vert s \vert < t < \delta$, and if s is such that $\phi(h(y), s) = h \circ \psi(y, t)$, then $s > 0$.

Overall, topological equivalence is a weaker equivalence criterion than topological conjugacy, as it does not require that the time term is mapped along with the orbits and their orientation. An example of a topologically equivalent but not topologically conjugate system would be the non-hyperbolic class of two dimensional systems of differential equations that have closed orbits. While the orbits can be transformed to each other to overlap in the spatial sense, the periods of such systems cannot be analogously matched, thus failing to satisfy the topological conjugacy criterion while satisfying the topological equivalence criterion.

== Smooth and orbital equivalence ==
More equivalence criteria can be studied if the flows, $\phi$ and $\psi$, arise from differential equations.

Two dynamical systems defined by the differential equations, $\dot{x} = f(x)$ and $\dot{y} = g(y)$, are said to be smoothly equivalent if there is a diffeomorphism, $h: X \to Y$, such that

$$f(x) = M^{-1}(x) g(h(x)) \quad\text{where}\quad M(x) = \frac{\mathrm{d}h(x)}{\mathrm{d}x}.$$

In that case, the dynamical systems can be transformed into each other by the coordinate transformation, $y = h(x)$.

Two dynamical systems on the same state space, defined by $\dot{x} = f(x)$ and $\dot{x} = g(x)$, are said to be orbitally equivalent if there is a positive function, $\mu : X \to \mathbb{R}$, such that $g(x) = \mu(x) f(x)$. Orbitally equivalent system differ only in the time parametrization.

Systems that are smoothly equivalent or orbitally equivalent are also topologically equivalent. However, the reverse is not true. For example, consider linear systems in two dimensions of the form $\dot{x} = Ax$. If the matrix, $A$, has two positive real eigenvalues, the system has an unstable node; if the matrix has two complex eigenvalues with positive real part, the system has an unstable focus (or spiral). Nodes and foci are topologically equivalent but not orbitally equivalent or smoothly equivalent, because their eigenvalues are different (notice that the Jacobians of two locally smoothly equivalent systems must be similar, so their eigenvalues, as well as algebraic and geometric multiplicities, must be equal).

== Generalizations of dynamic topological conjugacy ==
There are two reported extensions of the concept of dynamic topological conjugacy:

1. Analogous systems defined as isomorphic dynamical systems
2. Adjoint dynamical systems defined via adjoint functors and natural equivalences in categorical dynamics.

== See also ==
- Commutative diagram
