= Siméon Denis Poisson =

French mathematician and physicist (1781–1840)

Siméon Poisson
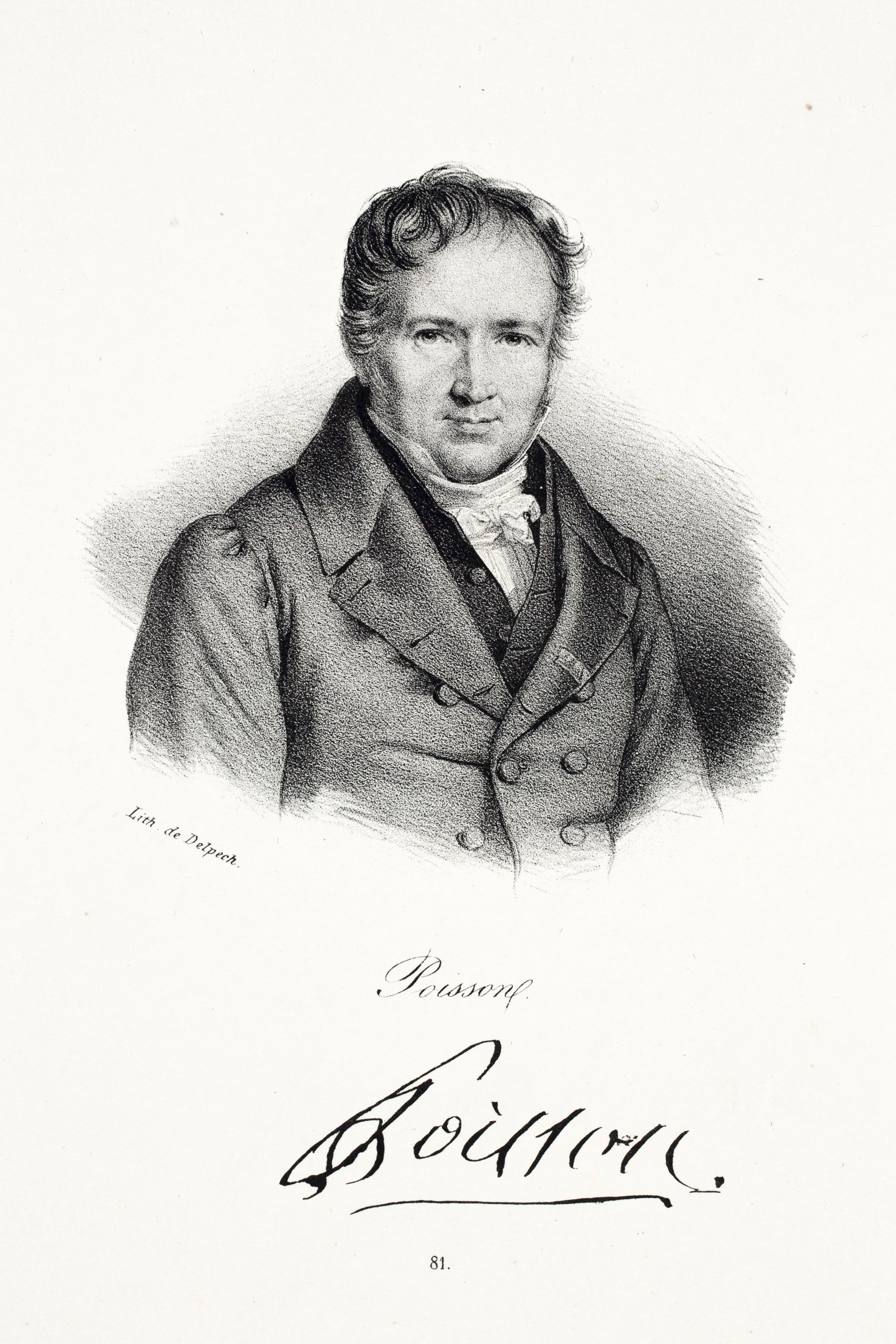
- Born: 21 June 1781; Pithiviers, Kingdom of France
- Died: 25 April 1840 (aged 58); Sceaux, Kingdom of France
- Education: École Polytechnique
- Known for: Poisson process; Poisson equation; Poisson kernel; Poisson distribution; Poisson bracket; Poisson's spot; Poisson's ratio; See list
- Scientific career
- Fields: Mathematics; physics
- Workplaces: École Polytechnique; Bureau des Longitudes; Faculté des sciences de Paris; École de Saint-Cyr
- Academic advisors: Joseph-Louis Lagrange; Pierre-Simon Laplace
- Doctoral students: Michel Chasles; Joseph Liouville
- Other notable students: Nicolas Léonard Sadi Carnot; Peter Gustav Lejeune Dirichlet

Baron Siméon Denis Poisson (US: /pwɑːˈsɒn/ pwahss-ON, UK: /ˈpwɑːsɒn, ˈpwæsɒn/ PWA(H)SS-on; French: [simeɔ̃ dəni pwasɔ̃]; 21 June 1781 – 25 April 1840) was a French mathematician and physicist who worked on statistics, complex analysis, partial differential equations, the calculus of variations, analytical mechanics, electricity and magnetism, thermodynamics, elasticity, and fluid mechanics. Moreover, he predicted the Arago spot in his attempt to disprove the wave theory of Augustin-Jean Fresnel.

While his interpretations of physical phenomena were often proven wrong by later researchers, his contributions to mathematics have stood the test of time. He demonstrated that physical problems could suggest new mathematical ideas.

== Early life and education ==
Poisson was born in the small town of Pithiviers, now in Loiret, France, about 50 miles (80 km) south of Paris. His father was Siméon Poisson, a retired soldier in the French Army who had served in the Seven Years' War.

In 1798, Poisson, then seventeen years of age, matriculated at the École Polytechnique in Paris after scoring in first place in the highly competitive entrance examination. Even as a first-year student, he immediately began to attract the notice of the professors of the school, who left him free to make his own decisions as to what he would study.

In his final year of study, less than two years after his entry, he published two memoirs: one on Étienne Bézout's method of elimination, the other on the number of integrals of a finite difference equation. This was so impressive that he was allowed to graduate in 1800 without taking the final examination.

The latter of the two memoirs was examined by Sylvestre-François Lacroix and Adrien-Marie Legendre, who recommended that it should be published in the Recueil des savants étrangers, an unprecedented honor for an eighteen-year-old. This success at once gave Poisson admittance into scientific circles. Joseph-Louis Lagrange, whose lectures on the theory of functions he attended at the École Polytechnique, recognized his talent early on and became his friend. Meanwhile, Pierre-Simon Laplace, in whose footsteps Poisson followed, regarded him almost as his son. The rest of his career until his death in Sceaux, near Paris, was occupied by the composition and publication of his many works and in fulfilling the duties of the numerous educational positions to which he was successively appointed.

== Career ==
Immediately after finishing his studies at the École Polytechnique, he was appointed répétiteur (teaching assistant) there, a position which he had occupied as an amateur while still a pupil in the school; for his schoolmates had made a custom of visiting him in his room after an unusually difficult lecture to hear him repeat and explain it. He was made deputy professor (professeur suppléant) in 1802, and, in 1806 full professor succeeding Jean Baptiste Joseph Fourier, whom Napoleon had sent to Grenoble. In 1808 he became astronomer to the Bureau des Longitudes; and when the Faculté des sciences de Paris was instituted in 1809 he was appointed a professor of rational mechanics (professeur de mécanique rationelle). He went on to become a member of the Institute in 1812, examiner at the military school (École Militaire) at Saint-Cyr in 1815, graduation examiner at the École Polytechnique in 1816, councillor of the university in 1820, and geometer to the Bureau des Longitudes succeeding Laplace in 1827.

As a teacher of mathematics Poisson is said to have been extraordinarily successful, as might have been expected from his early promise as a répétiteur at the École Polytechnique. Despite his many official duties, Poisson still found the time and energy to publish over 300 works on a variety of mathematical topics. Arago attributed to him the quote, "Life is good for only two things: doing mathematics and teaching it." A list of Poisson's works, drawn up by himself, is given at the end of Arago's biography. His greatest services to science were performed in the application of mathematics to the study of physics. Some of the most influential were his memoirs on electricity and magnetism.

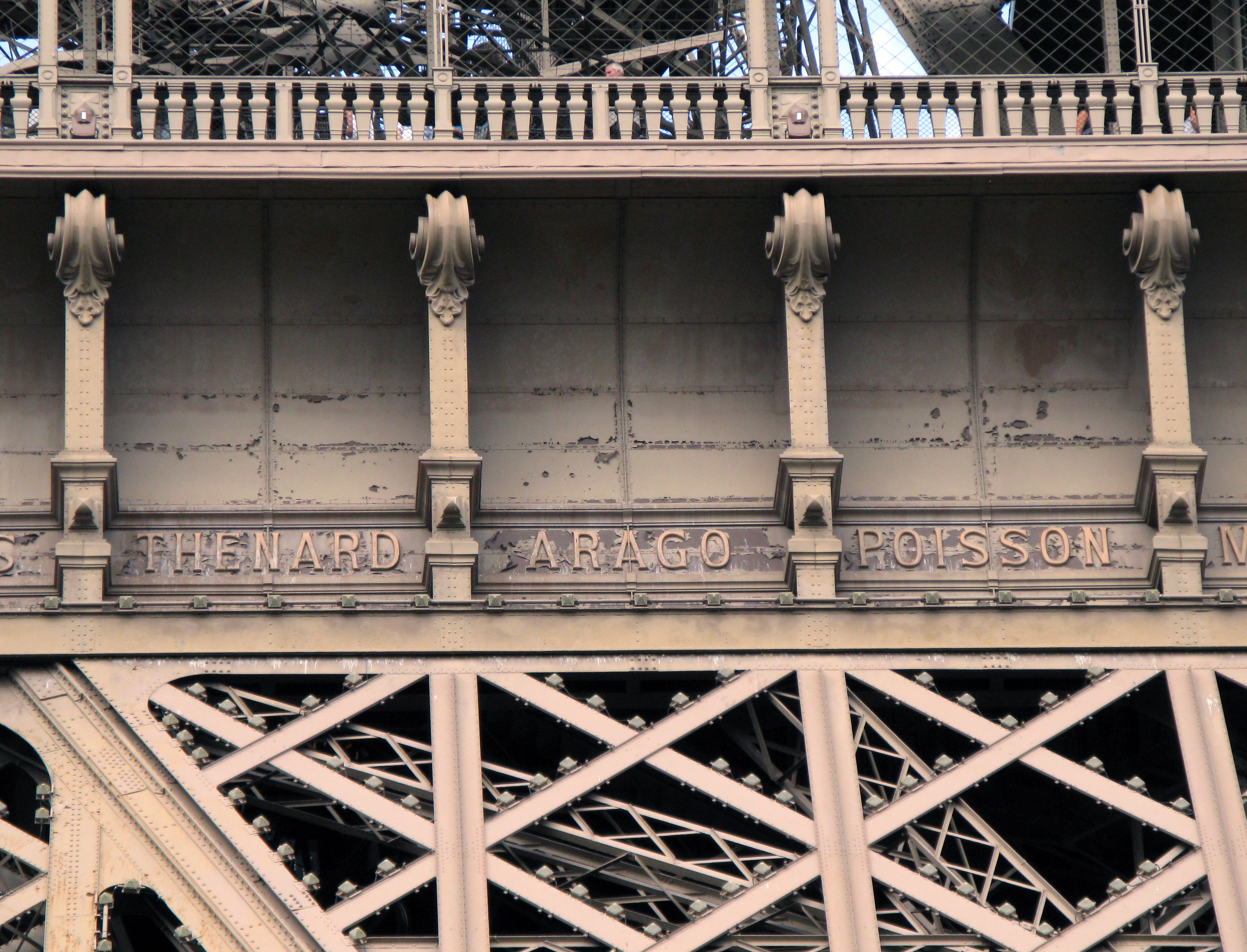
The name of Poisson (first from the right) inscribed on the Eiffel Tower

Also of great importance were his memoirs on celestial mechanics, in which he proved himself a worthy successor to Laplace. The most important of these are his memoirs Sur les inégalités séculaires des moyens mouvements des planètes (On the Secular Inequalities for the Means of Planetary Motion), Sur la variation des constantes arbitraires dans les questions de mécanique (On the Variation of Arbitrary Constants in Questions of Mechanics), both published in the Journal of the École Polytechnique (1809); Sur la libration de la lune (On the Libration of the Moon), in Connaissance des temps (1821), etc.; and Sur le mouvement de la terre autour de son centre de gravité (On the Earth's Movement About Its Center of Gravity), in Mémoires de l'Académie (1827). In the first of these memoirs, Poisson discusses the famous question of the stability of the planetary orbits, which had already been settled by Lagrange to the first degree of approximation for the disturbing forces. Poisson showed that the result could be extended to a second approximation, and thus made an important advance in planetary theory. The memoir is remarkable inasmuch as it roused Lagrange, after an interval of inactivity, to compose in his old age one of the greatest of his memoirs, entitled Sur la théorie des variations des éléments des planètes, et en particulier des variations des grands axes de leurs orbites (On the theory of variations in the elements of the planets, and in particular the variations in the major axes of their orbits). So highly did he think of Poisson's memoir that he made a copy of it with his own hand, which was found among his papers after his death.

== Personal life and honors ==
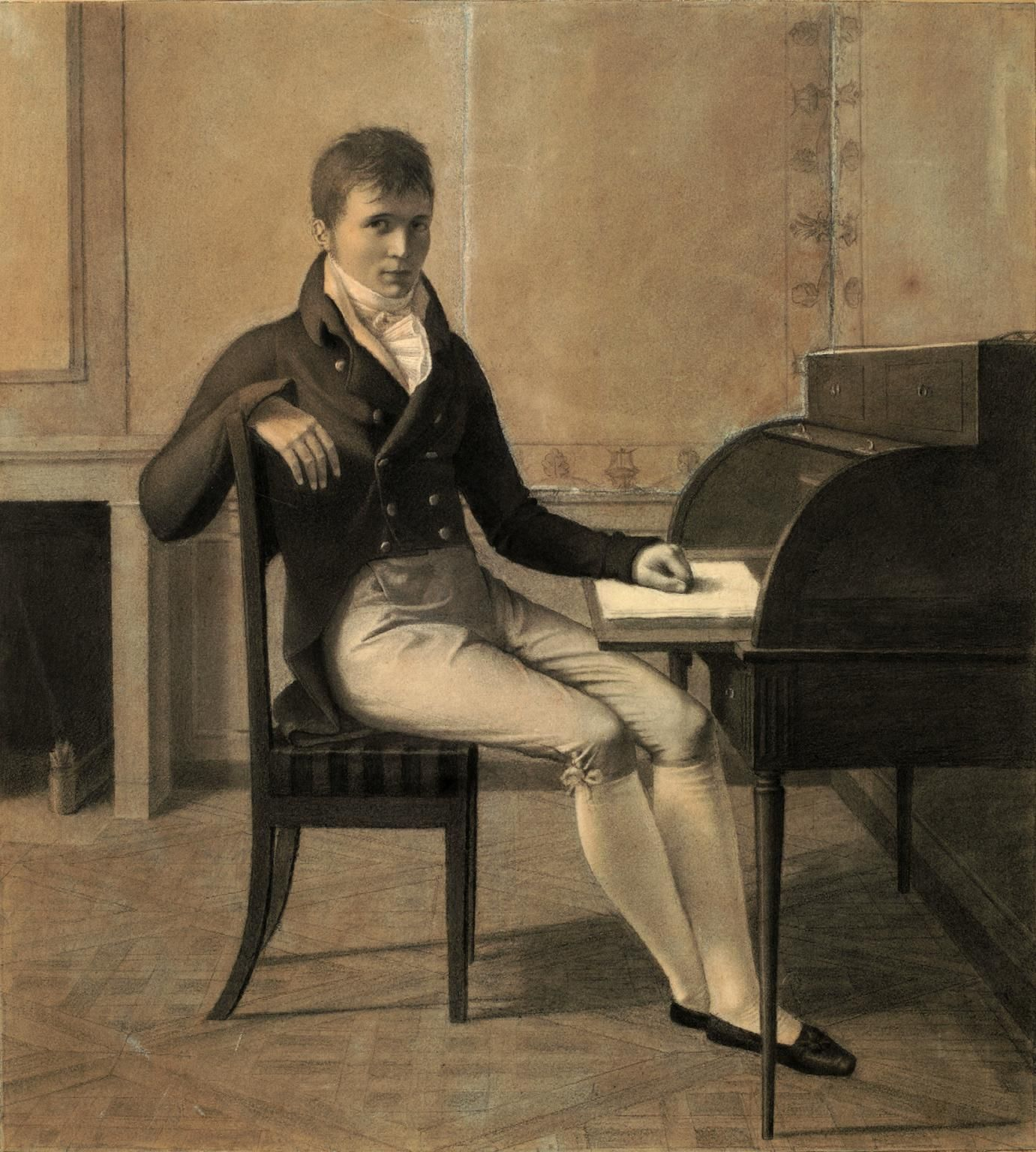
Poisson's 1804 portrait by E. Marcellot, now in the collection of the École Polytechnique.

In 1817, he married Nancy de Bardi and had four children with her. His father, whose early experiences had led him to hate aristocrats, bred him in the stern creed of the First Republic. Throughout the Revolution, the First Empire, and the Bourbon Restoration, Poisson was not interested in politics, concentrating instead on mathematics. He was appointed to the dignity of baron in 1825, but he neither took out the diploma nor used the title.

The revolution of July 1830 threatened him with the loss of all his honors; but this threat from to the government of Louis-Philippe I was removed by François Jean Dominique Arago, who, while his "revocation" was being plotted by the council of ministers, procured him an invitation to dine at the Palais-Royal, where he was openly and effusively received by the citizen king, who "remembered" him. After this, of course, his degradation was impossible, and in 1837 he was made a peer of France, not for political reasons, but as a representative of French science.

In March 1818, he was elected a Fellow of the Royal Society, in 1822 a Foreign Honorary Member of the American Academy of Arts and Sciences, and in 1823 a foreign member of the Royal Swedish Academy of Sciences.

Poisson died on 25 April 1840 in Sceaux. He was 58 years old. At the time of his death, he was working on a treatise of mathematical physics incorporating his contributions to various branches of the subject.

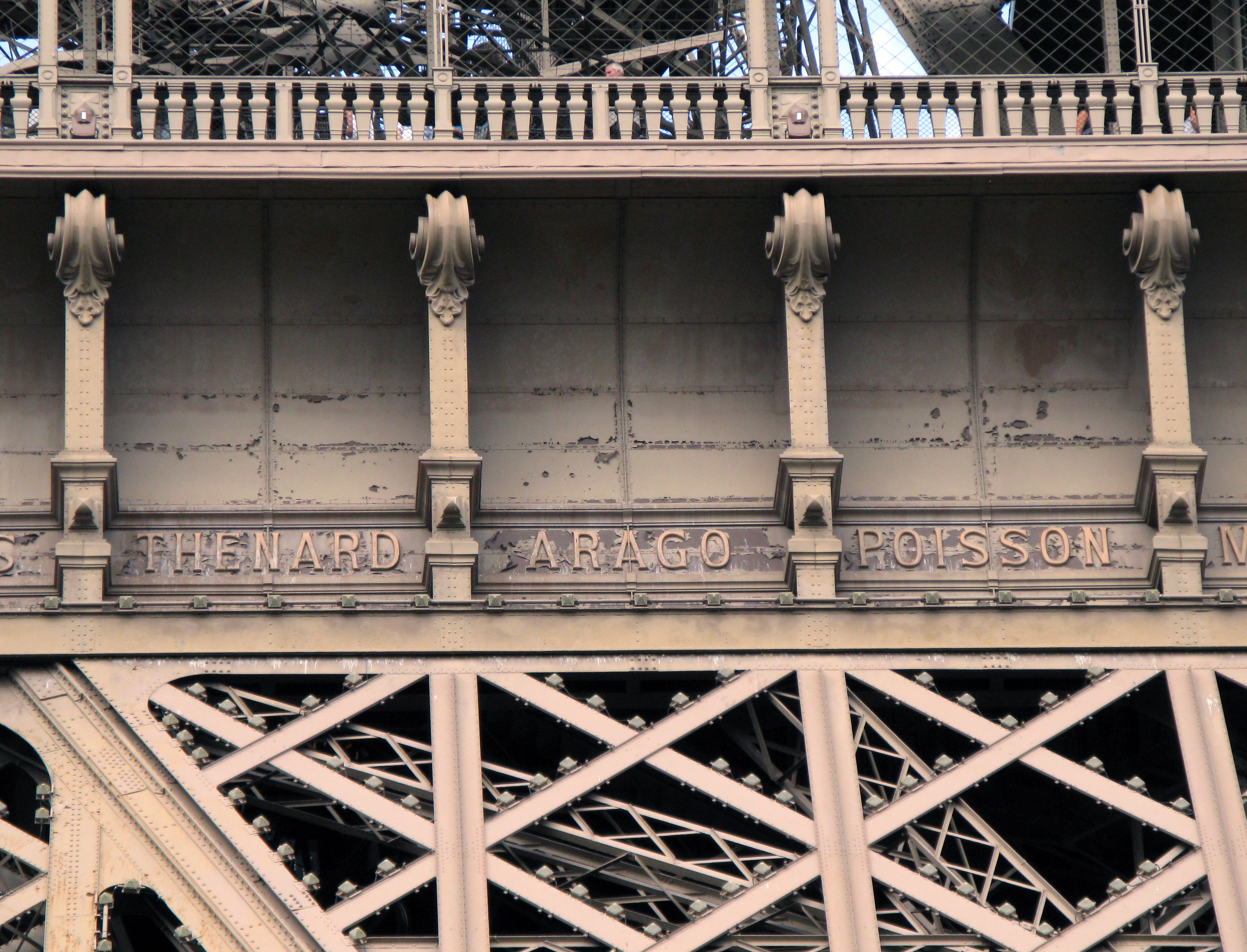
Poisson is one of the 72 names inscribed on the Eiffel Tower, visible on the right of this photograph.

Poisson is one of the 72 names inscribed on the Eiffel Tower. A decade after he died, a life-sized brass statue of Poisson was erected in his hometown. But it was melted down during the German occupation of France in the Second World War. Nevertheless, there is still a square in the center of Pithiviers that bears his name, the Place Denis Poisson.

In 2014, an exhibit of some of the key works of Poisson, their critical evaluations, and continuations were put on display at the Pierre and Marie Curie University in Paris, and later at the University of Illinois at Urbana–Champaign and the University of California at Berkeley in the United States.

== Contributions ==
=== Potential theory ===
==== Poisson's equation ====
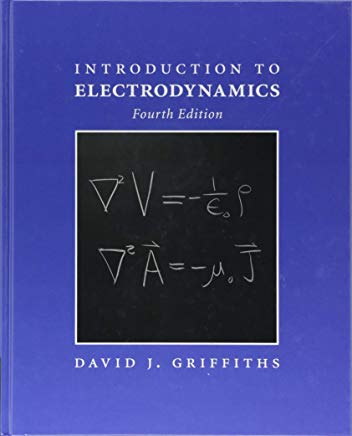
Poisson's equations for electricity (top) and magnetism (bottom) in SI units on the front cover of an undergraduate textbook.

In the theory of potentials, Poisson's equation,

$$\nabla^2 \phi = - 4 \pi \rho, \;$$

is a well-known generalization of Laplace's equation of the second order partial differential equation $\nabla^2 \phi = 0$ for potential $\phi$.

If $\rho(x, y, z)$ is a continuous function and if for $r \rightarrow \infty$ (or if a point 'moves' to infinity) a function $\phi$ goes to 0 fast enough, the solution of Poisson's equation is the Newtonian potential

$$\phi = - {1\over 4 \pi} \iiint \frac{\rho (x, y, z)}{ r} \, dV, \;$$

where $r$ is a distance between a volume element $dV$and a point $P$. The integration runs over the whole space.

Poisson's equation was first published in the Bulletin de la société philomatique (1813). Poisson's two most important memoirs on the subject are Sur l'attraction des sphéroides (Connaiss. ft. temps, 1829), and Sur l'attraction d'un ellipsoide homogène (Mim. ft. l'acad., 1835).

Poisson discovered that Laplace's equation is valid only outside of a solid. A rigorous proof for masses with variable density was first given by Carl Friedrich Gauss in 1839. Poisson's equation is applicable in not just gravitation, but also electricity and magnetism.

==== Electricity and magnetism ====
As the eighteenth century came to a close, human understanding of electrostatics approached maturity. Benjamin Franklin had already established the notion of electric charge and the conservation of charge; Charles-Augustin de Coulomb had enunciated his inverse-square law of electrostatics. In 1777, Joseph-Louis Lagrange introduced the concept of a potential function that can be used to compute the gravitational force of an extended body. In 1812, Poisson adopted this idea and obtained the appropriate expression for electricity, which relates the potential function $V$ to the electric charge density $\rho$. Poisson's work on potential theory inspired George Green's 1828 paper, An Essay on the Application of Mathematical Analysis to the Theories of Electricity and Magnetism.

In 1820, Hans Christian Ørsted demonstrated that it was possible to deflect a magnetic needle by closing or opening an electric circuit nearby, resulting in a deluge of published papers attempting to explain the phenomenon. Ampère's force law and the Biot-Savart law were quickly deduced. The science of electromagnetism was born. Poisson was also investigating the phenomenon of magnetism at this time, though he insisted on treating electricity and magnetism as separate phenomena. He published two memoirs on magnetism in 1826. By the 1830s, a major research question in the study of electricity was whether or not electricity was a fluid or fluids distinct from matter, or something that simply acts on matter like gravity. Coulomb, André-Marie Ampère, and Poisson thought that electricity was a fluid distinct from matter. However, in his experimental research, starting with electrolysis, Michael Faraday sought to show this was not the case. Electricity, Faraday believed, was a part of matter.

In his A History of the Theories of Aether and Electricity (1910), Edmund Taylor Whittaker praised Poisson for his mathematical treatment of electrostatics and noted that even though Poisson's interpretation of the physics of electromagnetic induction was wrong, Poisson's equation for magnetism remained valid.

=== Optics ===
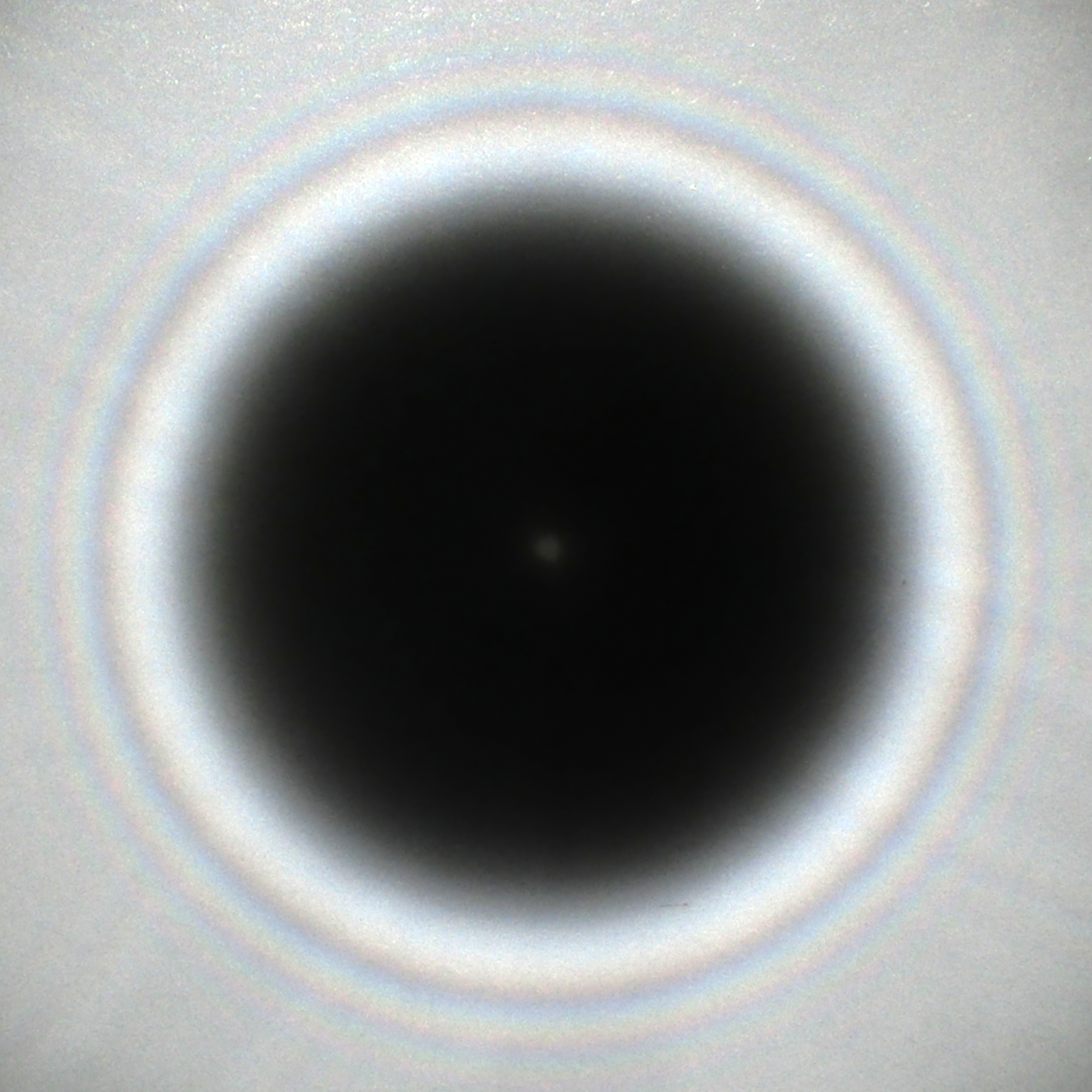
Photo of the Arago spot in a shadow of a 5.8 mm circular obstacle.

Like his mentor Laplace, Poisson favored the Newton's corpuscular theory of light and was skeptical of its alternative, the wave theory. In 1817, Augustin-Jean Fresnel submitted a paper for a grand prize of the French Academy of Science on the phenomenon of diffraction. As a member of the examination committee, Poisson sought a way to disprove it. He calculated that Fresnel's predicted an on-axis bright spot in the shadow of a circular obstacle blocking a point source of light, where the particle-theory of light predicts complete darkness. For Poisson, this was absurd and had to be wrong.

The head of the committee, Dominique-François-Jean Arago, performed the experiment. He molded a 2-mm metallic disk to a glass plate with wax. To everyone's surprise he observed the predicted bright spot, which vindicated the wave model. Fresnel won the competition.

This subsequently became known as the Poisson spot, though it had already been observed by Joseph-Nicolas Delisle and Giacomo F. Maraldi a century earlier.

=== Pure mathematics and statistics ===
Sample Poisson distributions. For large values of the mean $\lambda$, the Poisson distribution approaches the Gaussian or normal distribution.

Poisson's very first paper, written while he was still a student, was an "Addition" to a previous publication by Gaspard Monge and Jean Nicolas Pierre Hachette on the classification of quadrics. It was his last paper written in collaboration. Hachette co-signed this contribution.

His second paper concerned the elimination of variables in systems of algebraic equations. Poisson gave a simplified proof of a theorem by Bézout on algebraic curves.

In 1820 Poisson studied integrations along paths in the complex plane, becoming the first person to do so.

Poisson discovered the Poisson summation formula in his precise evaluation of the remainder of the Euler–Maclaurin formula in 1823. Today, the generalization of this formula in the theory of group representations has applications in network theory and error-correcting code.

An early instance of the probability distribution named after Poisson occurs in The Doctrine of Chances (1718) by Abraham de Moivre. The modern Poisson distribution made its first appearance in a 1829 paper by Poisson on birth statistics, Mémoire sur la proportion des naissances des filles et des garçons (Essay on the Proportion of Newborn Girls and Boys), published in 1830. Poisson statistics appeared again in the book Recherches sur la probabilité des jugements (Research on the Probability of Judgments) in 1837.

=== Mechanics ===
==== Analytical mechanics and the calculus of variations ====
The Euler–Poisson equation is a generalization of the Euler–Lagrange equation from the calculus of variations. Let $X$ be a set of functions $y:[a,b]\to\mathbb{R}$ of class $C^n$ and satisfying $y(a)=y_0,y(b)=y_1$, $f:\mathbb{R}^{n+1}\to\mathbb{R}$ be of class $C^{n+1}$ and let $S:X\to\mathbb{R}$ be given by a formula

$S[y] = \int\limits_{a}^{b} f \left(x, y(x), y'(x), ..., y^{(n)}(x) \right) \, dx,$

If $y$ is an extremal of $S$, then $f$ must satisfy the Euler–Poisson equation

$\frac{\partial f}{\partial y} - \frac{d}{dx} \left( \frac{\partial f}{\partial y'} \right) + ... + (-1)^{n} \frac{d^n}{dx^n} \left[ \frac{\partial f}{\partial y^{(n)}} \right]= 0.$

Poisson's Traité de mécanique (Treatise on Mechanics), in two volumes, is one of his most important scientific publications, written in the style of Lagrange and Laplace. In this work, Poisson credited Lagrange with applying the variation of parameters to mechanics. Unlike Lagrange, however, Poisson did make use of diagrams. Poisson omitted Newton's vectorial formulation of mechanics, choosing instead to focus on "analytical mechanics"—a term from the title of a treatise by Lagrange, Mécanique analytique (1788). Poisson stated the principle of virtual velocities (as virtual work was then known) in his treatment of statics and presented d'Alembert's principle as the general principle of dynamics. Let $q$ be the position, $T$ be the kinetic energy, $V$ the potential energy, both independent of time $t$. Lagrange's equation of motion reads

$\frac{d}{dt} \left( \frac{\partial T}{\partial \dot{q}_i} \right) - \frac{\partial T}{\partial q_i} + \frac{\partial V}{\partial q_i} = 0, ~~~~ i = 1, 2, ... , n.$

Here, Newton's dot notation for the time derivative is used, $\frac{dq}{dt} = \dot{q}$. Poisson set $L = T - V$. He argued that if $V$ were independent of $\dot{q}_i$, he could write

$\frac{d}{dt} \left (\frac{\partial L}{\partial \dot{q}_i} \right) - \frac{\partial L}{\partial q_i} = 0.$

He introduced an explicit formula for generalized momenta,

$p_i = \frac{\partial L}{\partial \dot{q}_i} = \frac{\partial T}{\partial \dot{q}_i}.$

Thus, from the equation of motion, he got

$\dot{p}_i = \frac{\partial L}{\partial q_i}.$

Poisson's text influenced the work of William Rowan Hamilton and Carl Gustav Jacob Jacobi.

In a paper read at the Institut de France in 1809, Poisson introduced a new expression, now referred to as the (canonical) Poisson bracket. Moreover, Poisson's theorem states the Poisson bracket of any two constants of motion is also a constant of motion. It was in this same 1809 paper that his expression for the generalized momentum first appeared. Poisson had introduced his brackets while attempting to integrate the equations of motion resulting from the theory of perturbations for planetary orbits. Poisson came close to developing the theory of canonical transformations. But it was Jacobi who first recognized the utility Poisson brackets in theoretical mechanics. In a series of lectures on dynamics delivered at the University of Königsberg during the 1842–43 academic year, Jacobi also presented his identity for Poisson brackets, which can be used to prove Poisson's theorem. The name "Poisson bracket" was likely used for the first time by E. T. Whittaker in 1910.

Arthur Cayley predicted in 1857 that Poisson brackets would eventually supplant those of Lagrange. Jacobi's identity for Poisson's brackets became the basis for the study of Lie algebras.

In September 1925, Paul Dirac received proofs of a seminal paper by Werner Heisenberg on the new branch of physics known as quantum mechanics. Soon he realized that the key idea in Heisenberg's paper was the anti-commutativity of dynamical variables and remembered that the analogous mathematical construction in classical mechanics was Poisson brackets. He found the treatment he needed in Whittaker's Analytical Dynamics of Particles and Rigid Bodies (1904).

==== Continuum mechanics and fluid flow ====
Unsolved problem in physics
Under what conditions do solutions to the Navier–Stokes equations exist and are smooth? This is a Millennium Prize Problem in mathematics.
More unsolved problems in physics

In 1821, using an analogy with elastic bodies, Claude-Louis Navier arrived at the basic equations of motion for viscous fluids, now identified as the Navier–Stokes equations. In 1829 Poisson independently obtained the same result. George Gabriel Stokes re-derived them in 1845 using continuum mechanics. Poisson, Cauchy, and Sophie Germain were the main contributors to the theory of elasticity in the nineteenth century. The calculus of variations was frequently used to solve problems. Poisson's ratio was first introduced in this context, and while Poisson's mathematical model was later shown to be wrong, this ratio remains of great academic interest and has found numerous applications.

In a 1829 paper on elastic bodies, Poisson gave a statement and proof of a special case of what became known as the divergence theorem.

==== Wave propagation ====
Poisson also published a memoir on the theory of waves (Mém. ft. l'acad., 1825).

=== Thermodynamics ===
In his work on heat conduction, Joseph Fourier maintained that the arbitrary function may be represented as an infinite trigonometric series and made explicit the possibility of expanding functions in terms of Bessel functions and Legendre polynomials, depending on the context of the problem. It took some time for his ideas to be accepted as his use of mathematics was less than rigorous. Although initially skeptical, Poisson adopted Fourier's method. From 1813 to 1823, Poisson wrote copiously on Fourier series and heat diffusion, paving the way for the classic researches of Peter Gustav Lejeune Dirichlet and Bernhard Riemann on the same subject. He also studied Fourier integrals. In the process, Poisson, alongside Augustin-Louis Cauchy and Charles Hermite, made early uses of a generalized function or distribution that would later be called the Dirac delta function. Poisson published his Théorie mathématique de la chaleur (Mathematical Theory of Heat) in 1835. While Poisson's (and Cauchy's) attempts to prove the convergence of Fourier series were unsuccessful, they led to the discovery of the Poisson kernel. Thanks to the works of Dirichlet and Hermann Schwarz, the Poisson kernel is now typically presented in the context of solving the Dirichlet problem for harmonic functions, though this was not what Poisson was studying.

During the early 1800s, Pierre-Simon de Laplace developed a sophisticated, if speculative, description of gases based on the old caloric theory of heat, to which younger scientists such as Poisson were less committed. A success for Laplace was his correction of Newton's formula for the speed of sound in air that gives satisfactory answers when compared with experiments. The Newton–Laplace formula makes use of the specific heats of gases at constant volume $c_V$and at constant pressure $c_P$. In 1823 Poisson redid his teacher's work and reached the same results without resorting to complex hypotheses previously employed by Laplace. In addition, by using the gas laws of Robert Boyle and Joseph Louis Gay-Lussac, Poisson obtained the equation for gases undergoing adiabatic changes, namely $PV^{\gamma} = \text{constant}$, where $P$ is the pressure of the gas, $V$ its volume, and $\gamma = \frac{c_P}{c_V}$.

=== Other works ===
Besides his many memoirs, Poisson published a number of treatises, most of which were intended to form part of a great work on mathematical physics, which he did not live to complete. Among these are:

- Nouvelle théorie de l'action capillaire (4to, 1831);
- Recherches sur la probabilité des jugements en matières criminelles et matière civile (4to, 1837), all published at Paris.
- A catalog of all of Poisson's papers and works can be found in Oeuvres complétes de François Arago, Vol. 2
- Mémoire sur l'équilibre et le mouvement des corps élastiques (v. 8 in Mémoires de l'Académie Royale des Sciences de l'Institut de France, 1829), digitized copy from the Bibliothèque nationale de France
- Recherches sur le Mouvement des Projectiles dans l'Air, en ayant égard a leur figure et leur rotation, et a l'influence du mouvement diurne de la terre (1839)
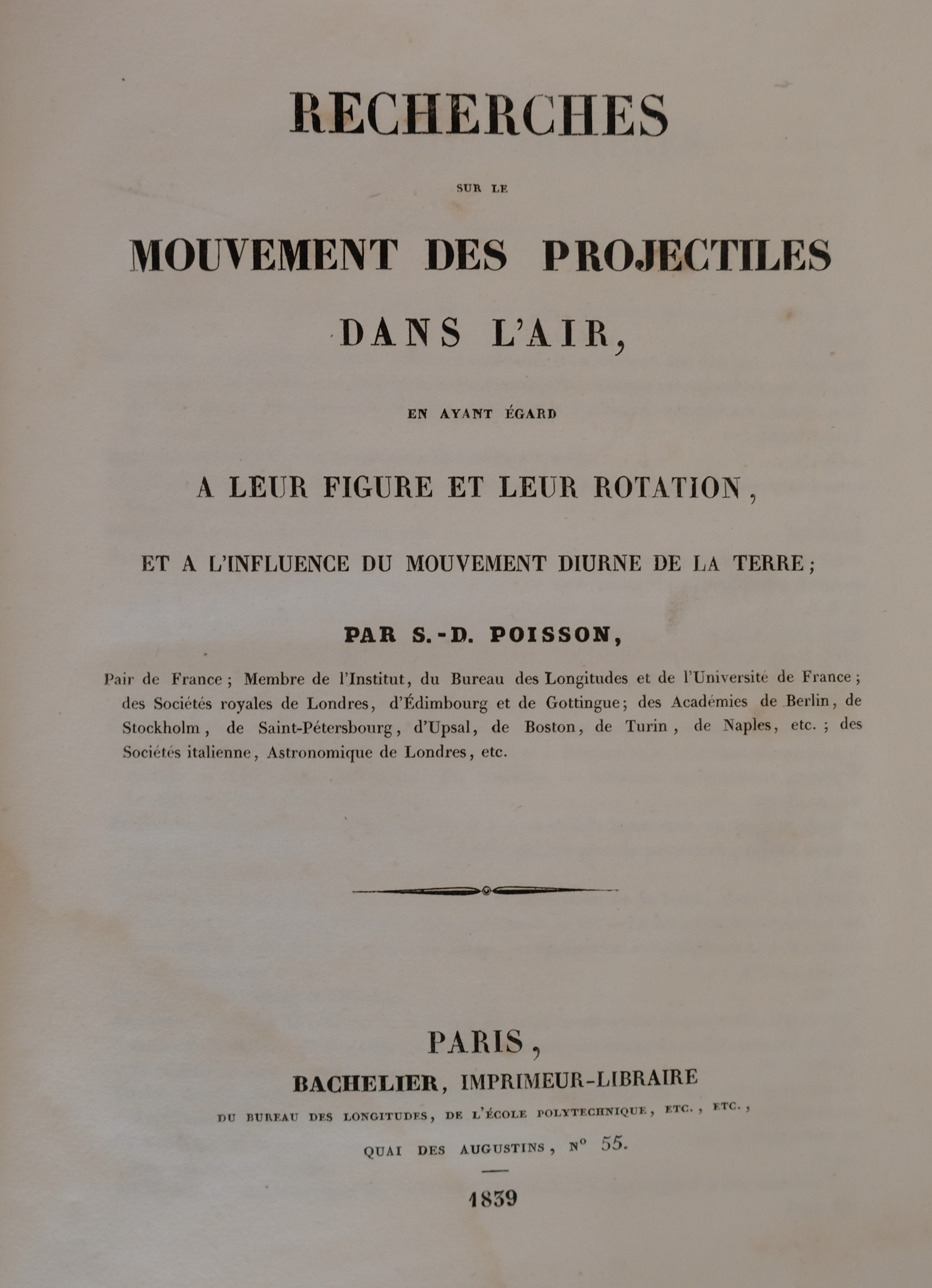
Title page to Recherches sur le Mouvement des Projectiles dans l'Air (1839)

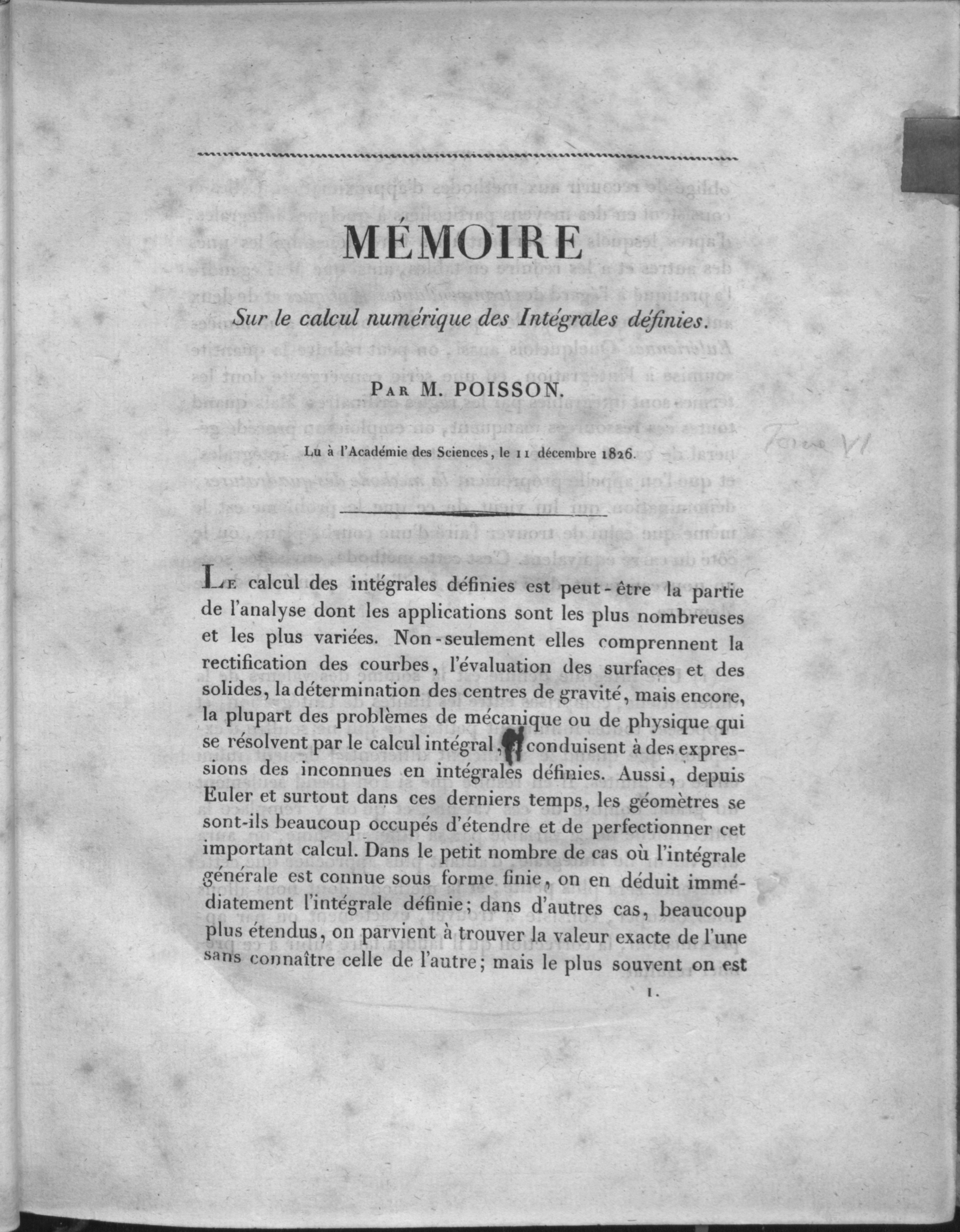
Mémoire sur le calcul numerique des integrales définies (1826)

== Interaction with Évariste Galois ==
After political activist Évariste Galois had returned to mathematics after his expulsion from the École Normale, Poisson asked him to submit his work on the theory of equations, which he did January 1831. In early July, Poisson declared Galois' work "incomprehensible," but encouraged Galois to "publish the whole of his work in order to form a definitive opinion." While Poisson's report was made before Galois' 14 July arrest, it took until October to reach Galois in prison. It is unsurprising, in the light of his character and situation at the time, that Galois vehemently decided against publishing his papers through the academy and instead publish them privately through his friend Auguste Chevalier. Yet Galois did not ignore Poisson's advice. He began collecting all his mathematical manuscripts while still in prison, and continued polishing his ideas until his release on 29 April 1832, after which he was somehow persuaded to participate in what proved to be a fatal duel.

== See also ==
- List of things named after Siméon Denis Poisson
- Hamilton−Jacobi equation
- Lagrange bracket
