= Poisson ring =

In mathematics, a Poisson ring is a commutative ring on which an anticommutative and distributive binary operation $[\cdot,\cdot]$ satisfying the Jacobi identity and the product rule is defined. Such an operation is then known as the Poisson bracket of the Poisson ring.

Many important operations and results of symplectic geometry and Hamiltonian mechanics may be formulated in terms of the Poisson bracket and, hence, apply to Poisson algebras as well. This observation is important in studying the classical limit of quantum mechanics—the non-commutative algebra of operators on a Hilbert space has the Poisson algebra of functions on a symplectic manifold as a singular limit, and properties of the non-commutative algebra pass over to corresponding properties of the Poisson algebra.

== Definition ==
The Poisson bracket must satisfy the identities

- $[f,g] = -[g,f]$ (skew symmetry)
- $[f + g, h] = [f,h] + [g,h]$ (distributivity)
- $[fg,h] = f[g,h] + [f,h]g$ (derivation)
- $[f,[g,h]] + [g,[h,f]] + [h,[f,g]] = 0$ (Jacobi identity)

for all $f,g,h$ in the ring.

A Poisson algebra is a Poisson ring that is also an algebra over a field. In this case, add the extra requirement

$$[sf,g] = s[f,g]$$

for all scalars s.

For each g in a Poisson ring A, the operation $ad_g$ defined as $ad_g(f) = [f,g]$ is a derivation. If the set $\{ ad_g | g \in A \}$ generates the set of derivations of A, then A is said to be non-degenerate.

If a non-degenerate Poisson ring is isomorphic as a commutative ring to the algebra of smooth functions on a manifold M, then M must be a symplectic manifold and $[\cdot,\cdot]$ is the Poisson bracket defined by the symplectic form.
