= Mathieu transformation =

The Mathieu transformations make up a subgroup of canonical transformations preserving the differential form

$$\sum_i p_i \delta q_i=\sum_i P_i \delta Q_i \,$$

The transformation is named after the French mathematician Émile Léonard Mathieu.

== Details ==
In order to have this invariance, there should exist at least one relation between $q_i$ and $Q_i$ only (without any $p_i,P_i$ involved).

$$\begin{align}
\Omega_1(q_1,q_2,\ldots,q_n,Q_1,Q_2,\ldots Q_n) & =0 \\
& {}\  \  \vdots\\
\Omega_m(q_1,q_2,\ldots,q_n,Q_1,Q_2,\ldots Q_n) & =0
\end{align}$$

where $1 < m \le n$. When $m=n$ a Mathieu transformation becomes a Lagrange point transformation.

== See also ==
- Canonical transformation
