= Wandering set =

In mathematics, a concept that formalizes a certain idea of movement and mixing

In dynamical systems and ergodic theory, the concept of a wandering set formalizes a certain idea of movement and mixing. When a dynamical system has a wandering set of non-zero measure, then the system is a dissipative system. This is the opposite of a conservative system, to which the Poincaré recurrence theorem applies. Intuitively, the connection between wandering sets and dissipation is easily understood: if a portion of the phase space "wanders away" during normal time-evolution of the system, and is never visited again, then the system is dissipative. The language of wandering sets can be used to give a precise, mathematical definition to the concept of a dissipative system. The notion of wandering sets in phase space was introduced by Birkhoff in 1927.

== Wandering points ==
A common, discrete-time definition of wandering sets starts with a map $f:X\to X$ of a topological space X. A point $x\in X$ is said to be a wandering point if there is a neighbourhood U of x and a positive integer N such that for all $n>N$, the iterated map is non-intersecting:

$$f^n(U) \cap U = \varnothing.$$

A handier definition requires only that the intersection have measure zero. To be precise, the definition requires that X be a measure space, i.e. part of a triple $(X,\Sigma,\mu)$ of Borel sets $\Sigma$ and a measure $\mu$ such that

$$\mu\left(f^n(U) \cap U \right) = 0,$$

for all $n>N$. Similarly, a continuous-time system will have a map $\varphi_t:X\to X$ defining the time evolution or flow of the system, with the time-evolution operator $\varphi$ being a one-parameter continuous abelian group action on X:

$$\varphi_{t+s} = \varphi_t \circ \varphi_s.$$

In such a case, a wandering point $x\in X$ will have a neighbourhood U of x and a time T such that for all times $t>T$, the time-evolved map is of measure zero:

$$\mu\left(\varphi_t(U) \cap U \right) = 0.$$

These simpler definitions may be fully generalized to the group action of a topological group. Let $\Omega=(X,\Sigma,\mu)$ be a measure space, that is, a set with a measure defined on its Borel subsets. Let $\Gamma$ be a group acting on that set. Given a point $x \in \Omega$, the set

$$\{\gamma \cdot x : \gamma \in \Gamma\}$$

is called the trajectory or orbit of the point x.

An element $x \in \Omega$ is called a wandering point if there exists a neighborhood U of x and a neighborhood V of the identity in $\Gamma$ such that

$$\mu\left(\gamma \cdot U \cap U\right)=0$$

for all $\gamma \in \Gamma-V$.

== Non-wandering points ==
A non-wandering point is the opposite. In the discrete case, $x\in X$ is non-wandering if, for every open set U containing x and every N > 0, there is some n > N such that

$$\mu\left(f^n(U)\cap U \right) > 0.$$

Similar definitions follow for the continuous-time and discrete and continuous group actions.

== Wandering sets and dissipative systems ==
A wandering set is a collection of wandering points. More precisely, a subset W of $\Omega$ is a wandering set under the action of a discrete group $\Gamma$ if W is measurable and if, for any $\gamma \in \Gamma - \{e\}$ the intersection

$$\gamma W \cap W$$

is a set of measure zero.

The concept of a wandering set is in a sense dual to the ideas expressed in the Poincaré recurrence theorem. If there exists a wandering set of positive measure, then the action of $\Gamma$ is said to be dissipative, and the dynamical system $(\Omega, \Gamma)$ is said to be a dissipative system. If there is no such wandering set, the action is said to be conservative, and the system is a conservative system. For example, any system for which the Poincaré recurrence theorem holds cannot have, by definition, a wandering set of positive measure; and is thus an example of a conservative system.

Define the trajectory of a wandering set W as

$$W^* = \bigcup_{\gamma \in \Gamma} \;\; \gamma W.$$

The action of $\Gamma$ is said to be completely dissipative if there exists a wandering set W of positive measure, such that the orbit $W^*$ is almost-everywhere equal to $\Omega$, that is, if

$$\Omega - W^*$$

is a set of measure zero.

The Hopf decomposition states that every measure space with a non-singular transformation can be decomposed into an invariant conservative set and an invariant wandering set.

== See also ==
- No wandering domain theorem
