= Goodwin model =

Goodwin model may refer to:

- Goodwin model (economics)
- Goodwin model (biology)
