= Absorbing barrier (disambiguation) =

An absorbing barrier may refer to:

- Absorbing barrier (finance), ruin, anything that prevents people with skin in the game from emerging from a financial state.
- Absorbing barrier, an energy-absorbing and energy-dissipating barrier used along roads, for increasing road traffic safety.
