= Goodwin model (biology) =

The Goodwin model is a mathematical model of genetic regulation proposed in 1963 by the British theoretical biologist Brian C. Goodwin. It describes how a simple negative feedback loop between a gene, its messenger RNA, the corresponding protein and a metabolite can generate sustained oscillations in concentration. It has been used to describe circadian rhythms or enzymatic regulation (such as lactose in bacteria).

Although the original two-variable Goodwin model can sustain oscillations, it possesses no limit cycle: the system is conservative, so its closed orbits form a continuous family and the amplitude of the oscillation depends on the initial conditions rather than converging to a single attracting cycle. In this respect the Goodwin model resembles the Lotka–Volterra equations. Limit cycles do arise in extended formulations of the model .
