= Ergodic flow =

In mathematics, ergodic flows occur in geometry, through the geodesic and horocycle flows of closed hyperbolic surfaces. Both of these examples have been understood in terms of the theory of unitary representations of locally compact groups: if Γ is the fundamental group of a closed surface, regarded as a discrete subgroup of the Möbius group G = PSL(2,R), then the geodesic and horocycle flow can be identified with the natural actions of the subgroups A of real positive diagonal matrices and N of lower unitriangular matrices on the unit tangent bundle G / Γ. The Ambrose-Kakutani theorem expresses every ergodic flow as the flow built from an invertible ergodic transformation on a measure space using a ceiling function. In the case of geodesic flow, the ergodic transformation can be understood in terms of symbolic dynamics; and in terms of the ergodic actions of Γ on the boundary S^{1} = G / AN and G / A = S^{1} × S^{1} \ diag S^{1}. Ergodic flows also arise naturally as invariants in the classification of von Neumann algebras: the flow of weights for a factor of type III_{0} is an ergodic flow on a measure space.

== Hedlund's theorem: ergodicity of geodesic and horocycle flows ==
The method using representation theory relies on the following two results:

- If G = SL(2,R) acts unitarily on a Hilbert space H and ξ is a unit vector fixed by the subgroup N of upper unitriangular matrices, then ξ is fixed by G.
- If G = SL(2,R) acts unitarily on a Hilbert space H and ξ is a unit vector fixed by the subgroup A of diagonal matrices of determinant 1, then ξ is fixed by G.

(1) As a topological space, the homogeneous space X = G / N can be identified with R^{2} \ {0} with the standard action of G as 2 × 2 matrices. The subgroup of N has two kinds of orbits: orbits parallel to the x-axis with y ≠ 0; and points on the x-axis. A continuous function on X that is constant on N-orbits must therefore be constant on the real axis with the origin removed. Thus the matrix coefficient ψ(x) = (xξ,ξ) satisfies ψ(g) = 1 for g in A · N. By unitarity, ||gξ − ξ||^{2} = 2 − ψ(g) − ψ(g^{–1}) = 0, so that gξ = ξ for all g in B = A · N = N · A. Now let s be the matrix
$$\begin{pmatrix} 0 & 1 \\ -1 & 0 \end{pmatrix}$$
. Then, as is easily verified, the double coset BsB is dense in G; this is a special case of the Bruhat decomposition. Since ξ is fixed by B, the matrix coefficient ψ(g) is constant on BsB. By density, ψ(g) = 1 for all g in G. The same argument as above shows that gξ = ξ for all g in G.

(2) Suppose that ξ is fixed by A. For the unitary 1-parameter group N ≅ R, let P[a,b] be the spectral subspace corresponding to the interval [a,b]. Let g(s) be the diagonal matrix with entries s and s^{−1} for |s| > 1. Then g(s)P[a,b]g(s)^{−1} = P[s^{2}a, s^{2}a]. As |s| tends to infinity the latter projections tend to 0 in the strong operator topology if 0< a < b or a < b < 0. Since g(s)ξ = ξ, it follows P[a,b]ξ = 0 in either case. By the spectral theorem, it follows that ξ is in the spectral subspace P({0}); in other words ξ is fixed by N. But then, by the first result, ξ must be fixed by G.

The classical theorems of Gustav Hedlund from the early 1930s assert the ergodicity of the geodesic and horocycle flows corresponding to compact Riemann surfaces of constant negative curvature. Hedlund's theorem can be re-interpreted in terms of unitary representations of G and its subgroups. Let Γ be a cocompact subgroup of PSL(2,R) = G / {±I} for which all non-scalar elements are hyperbolic. Let X = Γ \ G / K where K is the subgroup of rotations
$$\begin{pmatrix} \cos \theta & \sin \theta \\ -\sin \theta & \cos \theta \end{pmatrix}$$
. The unit tangent bundle is SX = Γ \ G, with the geodesic flow given by the right action of A and the horocycle flow by the right action of N. This action if ergodic if L^{∞}(Γ \ G)^{A} = C, i.e. the functions fixed by A are just the constant functions. Since Γ \ G is compact, this will be the case if L^{2}(Γ \ G)^{A} = C. Let H = L^{2}(Γ \ G). Thus G acts unitarily on H on the right. Any non-zero ξ in H fixed by A must be fixed by G, by the second result above. But in this case, if f is a continuous function on G of compact support with ∫ f = 1, then ξ = ∫ f(g) gξ dg. The right hand side equals ξ ∗ f, a continuous function on G. Since ξ is right-invariant under G, it follows that ξ is constant, as required. Hence the geodesic flow is ergodic. Replacing A by N and using the first result above, the same argument shows that the horocycle flow is ergodic.

== Ambrose−Kakutani–Krengel–Kubo theorem ==
=== Induced flows ===
Examples of flows induced from non-singular invertible transformations of measure spaces were defined by von Neumann (1932) in his operator-theoretic approach to classical mechanics and ergodic theory. Let T be a non-singular invertible transformation of (X,μ) giving rise to an automorphism τ of A = L^{∞}(X). This gives rise to an invertible transformation T ⊗ id of the measure space (X × R,μ × m), where m is Lebesgue measure, and hence an automorphism τ ⊗ id of A ⊗ L^{∞}(R). Translation L_{t} defines a flow on R preserving m and hence a flow λ_{t} on L^{∞}(R). Let S = L_{1} with corresponding automorphism σ of L^{∞}(R). Thus τ ⊗ σ gives an automorphism of A ⊗ L^{∞}(R) which commutes with the flow id ⊗ λ_{t}. The induced measure space Y is defined by B = L^{∞}(Y) = L^{∞}(X × R)^{τ ⊗ σ}, the functions fixed by the automorphism τ ⊗ σ. It admits the induced flow given by the restriction of id ⊗ λ_{t} to B. Since λ_{t} acts ergodically on L^{∞}(R), it follows that the functions fixed by the flow can be identified with L^{∞}(X)^{τ}. In particular if the original transformation is ergodic, the flow that it induces is also ergodic.

=== Flows built under a ceiling function ===
The induced action can also be described in terms of unitary operators and it is this approach which clarifies the generalisation to special flows, i.e. flows built under ceiling functions. Let R be the Fourier transform on L^{2}(R,m), a unitary operator such that Rλ(t)R^{∗} = V_{t} where λ(t) is translation by t and V_{t} is multiplication by e^{itx}. Thus V_{t} lies in L^{∞}(R). In particular V_{1} = R S R^{∗}. A ceiling function h is a function in A with h ≥ ε1 with ε > 0. Then e^{ihx} gives a unitary representation of R in A, continuous in the strong operator topology and hence a unitary element W of A ⊗ L^{∞}(R), acting on L^{2}(X,μ) ⊗ L^{2}(R). In particular W commutes with I ⊗V_{t}. So W_{1} = (I ⊗ R^{∗}) W (I ⊗ R) commutes with I ⊗ λ(t). The action T on L^{∞}(X) induces a unitary U on L^{2}(X) using the square root of the Radon−Nikodym derivative of μ $\circ$ T with respect to μ. The induced algebra B is defined as the subalgebra of A ⊗ L^{∞}(R) commuting with T ⊗ S. The induced flow σ_{t} is given by σ_{t} (b) = (I ⊗ λ(t)) b (I ⊗ λ(−t)).

The special flow corresponding to the ceiling function h with base transformation T is defined on the algebra B(H) given by the elements in A ⊗ L^{∞}(R) commuting with (T ⊗ I) W_{1}. The induced flow corresponds to the ceiling function h ≡ 1, the constant function. Again W_{1}, and hence (T ⊗ I) W_{1}, commutes with I ⊗ λ(t). The special flow on B(H) is again given by σ_{t} (b) = (I ⊗ λ(t)) b (I ⊗ λ(−t)). The same reasoning as for induced actions shows that the functions fixed by the flow correspond to the functions in A fixed by σ, so that the special flow is ergodic if the original non-singular transformation T is ergodic.

=== Relation to Hopf decomposition ===
If S_{t} is an ergodic flow on the measure space (X,μ) corresponding to a 1-parameter group of automorphisms σ_{t} of A = L^{∞}(X,μ), then by the Hopf decomposition either every S_{t} with t ≠ 0 is dissipative or every S_{t} with t ≠ 0 is conservative. In the dissipative case, the ergodic flow must be transitive, so that A can be identified with L^{∞}(R) under Lebesgue measure and R acting by translation.

To prove the result on the dissipative case, note that A = L^{∞}(X,μ) is a maximal Abelian von Neumann algebra acting on the Hilbert space L^{2}(X,μ). The probability measure μ can be replaced by an equivalent invariant measure λ and there is a projection p in A such that σ_{t}(p) < p for t > 0 and λ(p – σ_{t}(p)) = t. In this case σ_{t}(p) =E([t,∞)) where E is a projection-valued measure on R. These projections generate a von Neumann subalgebra B of A. By ergodicity σ_{t}(p) $\uparrow$ 1 as t tends to −∞. The Hilbert space L^{2}(X,λ) can be identified with the completion of the subspace of f in A with λ(|f|^{2}) < ∞. The subspace corresponding to B can be identified with L^{2}(R) and B with L^{∞}(R). Since λ is invariant under S_{t}, it is implemented by a unitary representation U_{t}. By the Stone–von Neumann theorem for the covariant system B, U_{t}, the Hilbert space H = L^{2}(X,λ) admits a decomposition L^{2}(R) ⊗ $\ell^2$ where B and U_{t} act only on the first tensor factor. If there is an element a of A not in B, then it lies in the commutant of B ⊗ C, i.e. in B ⊗ B($\ell^2$). If can thus be realised as a matrix with entries in B. Multiplying by χ_{[r,s]} in B, the entries of a can be taken to be in L^{∞}(R) ∩ L^{1}(R). For such functions f, as an elementary case of the ergodic theorem the average of σ_{t}(f) over [−R,R] tends in the weak operator topology to ∫ f(t) dt. Hence for appropriate χ_{[r,s]} this will produce an element in A which lies in C ⊗ B($\ell^2$) and is not a multiple of 1 ⊗ I. But such an element commutes with U_{t} so is fixed by σ_{t}, contradicting ergodicity. Hence A = B = L^{∞}(R).

When all the σ_{t} with t ≠ 0 are conservative, the flow is said to be properly ergodic. In this case it follows that for every non-zero p in A and t ≠ 0, p ≤ σ_{t} (p) ∨ σ_{2t} (p) ∨ σ_{3t} (p) ∨ ⋅⋅⋅ In particular ∨_{±t>0} σ_{t} (p) = 1 for p ≠ 0.

=== Theorem of Ambrose–Kakutani–Krengel–Kubo ===
The theorem states that every ergodic flow is isomorphic to a special flow corresponding to a ceiling function with ergodic base transformation. If the flow leaves a probability measure invariant, the same is true of the base transformation.

For simplicity only the original result of Ambrose (1941) is considered, the case of an ergodic flow preserving a probability measure μ. Let A = L^{∞}(X,μ) and let σ_{t} be the ergodic flow. Since the flow is conservative, for any projection p ≠ 0, 1 in A there is a T > 0 without σ_{T}(p) ≤ p, so that (1 − p) ∧ σ_{T}(p) ≠ 0. On the other hand, as r > 0 decreases to zero

$$a_r = {1\over r}\int_0^r \sigma_t(p) \, dt \rightarrow p$$

in the strong operator topology or equivalently the weak operator topology (these topologies coincide on unitaries, hence involutions, hence projections). Indeed, it suffices to show that if ν is any finite measure on A, then ν(a_{r}) tends to ν(p). This follows because f(t) = ν(σ_{t}(p)) is a continuous function of t so that the average of f over [0,r] tends to f(0) as r tends to 0.

Note that 0 ≤ a_{r} ≤ 1. Now for fixed r > 0, following Ambrose (1941), set

$$q_0(r)=\chi_{[0,1/4]}(a_r), \,\,\, q_1(r)=\chi_{[3/4,1]}(a_r).$$

Set r = N^{–1} for N large and f_{N} = a_{r}. Thus 0 ≤ f_{N} ≤ 1 in L^{∞}(X,μ) and f_{N} tends to a characteristic function p in L^{1}(X,μ). But then, if ε = 1/4, it follows that χ_{[0,ε]}(f_{N}) tends to χ_{[0,ε]}(p) = 1 – p in L^{1}(X). Using the splitting A = pA ⊕ (1 − p)A, this reduces to proving that if 0 ≤ h_{N} ≤ 1 in L^{∞}(Y,ν) and h_{N} tends to 0 in L^{1}(Y,ν), then χ_{[1−ε,1]}(h_{N}) tends to 0 in L^{1}(Y,ν). But this follows easily by Chebyshev's inequality: indeed (1−ε) χ_{[1−ε,1]}(h_{N}) ≤ h_{N}, so that ν(χ_{[1−ε,1]}(h_{N})) ≤ (1−ε)^{−1} ν(h_{N}), which tends to 0 by assumption.

Thus by definition q_{0}(r) ∧ q_{1}(r) = 0. Moreover, for r = N^{−1} sufficiently small, q_{0}(r) ∧ σ_{T}(q_{1}(r)) > 0. The above reasoning shows that q_{0}(r) and q_{1}(r) tend to 1 − p and p as r = N^{−1} tends to 0. This implies that q_{0}(r)σ_{T}(q_{1}(r)) tends to (1 − p)σ_{T}(p) ≠ 0, so is non-zero for N sufficiently large. Fixing one such N and, with r = N^{−1}, setting q_{0}= q_{0}(r) and q_{1}= q_{1}(r), it can therefore be assumed that

$$q_0 \wedge q_1 =0,\,\,\,\, q_0 \wedge \sigma_T(q_1)>0.$$

The definition of q_{0} and q_{1} also implies that if δ < r/4 = (4N)^{−1}, then

$$\sigma_t(q_0)\wedge q_1 = 0 \,\,\,\mathrm{for}\,\,\, |t|\le \delta.$$

In fact if s < t

$$\|\sigma_t(a_r) - \sigma_s(a_r)\|_\infty = r^{-1}\left\|\int_{r+s}^{r+t} \sigma_x(p)\, dx - \int_s^{t} \sigma_x(p) \, dx\right\|_\infty \le {2|t-s|\over r}.$$

Take s = 0, so that t > 0 and suppose that e = σ_{t}(q_{0}) ∧ q_{1} > 0. So e = σ_{t}(f) with f ≤ q_{0}. Then σ_{t}(a_{r})e = σ_{t}(a_{r}f) ≤ 1/4 e and a_{r}e ≥ 3/4 e, so that

$$a_r -\sigma_t(a_r) \ge a_r e -\sigma_t(a_r)e \ge {3\over 4} e - {1\over 4}e={1\over 2} e.$$

Hence ||a_{r} − σ_{t}(a_{r})||_{∞} ≥ 1/2. On the other hand ||a_{r} − σ_{t}(a_{r})||_{∞} is bounded above by 2t/r, so that t ≥ r/4. Hence σ_{t}(q_{0}) ∧ q_{1} = 0 if |t| ≤ δ.

The elements a_{r} depend continuously in operator norm on r on (0,1]; from the above σ_{t}(a_{r}) is norm continuous in t. Let B_{0} the closure in the operator norm of the unital *-algebra generated by the σ_{t}(a_{r})'s. It is commutative and separable so, by the Gelfand–Naimark theorem, can be identified with C(Z) where Z is its spectrum, a compact metric space. By definition B_{0} is a subalgebra of A and its closure B in the weak or strong operator topology can be identified with L^{∞}(Z,μ) where μ is also used for the restriction of μ to B. The subalgebra B is invariant under the flow σ_{t}, which is therefore ergodic. The analysis of this action on B_{0} and B yields all the tools necessary for constructing the ergodic transformation T and ceiling function h. This will first be carried out for B (so that A will temporarily be assumed to coincide with B) and then later extended to A.

The projections q_{0} and q_{1} correspond to characteristic functions of open sets. X_{0} and X_{1} The assumption of proper ergodicity implies that the union of either of these open sets under translates by σ_{t} as t runs over the positive or negative reals is conull (i.e. the complement has measure zero). Replacing X by their intersection, an open set, it can be assumed that these unions exhaust the whole space (which will now be locally compact instead of compact). Since the flow is recurrent any orbit of σ_{t} passes through both sets infinitely many times as t tends to either +∞ or −∞. Between a spell first in X_{0} and then in X_{1} f must assume the value 1/2 and then 3/4. The last time f equals 1/2 to the first time it equals 3/4 must involve a change in t of at least δ/4 by the Lipschitz continuity condition. Hence each orbit must intersect the set Ω of x for which f(x) = 1/2, f(σ_{t}(x)) > 1/2 for 0 < t ≤ δ/4 infinitely often. The definition implies that different insections? with an orbit are separated by a distance of at least δ/4, so Ω intersects each orbit only countably many times and the intersections occur at indefinitely large negative and positive times. Thus each orbit is broken up into countably many half-open intervals [r_{n}(x),r_{n+1}(x)) of length at least δ/4 with r_{n}(x) tending to ±∞ as n tends to ±∞. This partitioning can be normalised so that r_{0}(x) ≤ 0 and r_{1}(x) > 0. In particular if x lies in Ω, then t_{0} = 0. The function r_{n}(x) is called the nth return time to Ω.

The cross-section Ω is a Borel set because on each compact set {σ_{t}(x)} with t in [N^{−1},δ/4] with N > 4/δ, the function g(t) = f(σ_{t}(x)) has an infimum greater than 1/2 + M^{−1} for a sufficiently large integer M. Hence Ω can be written as a countable intersection of sets, each of which is a countable unions of closed sets; so Ω is therefore a Borel set. This implies in particular that the functions r_{n} are Borel functions on X. Given y in Ω, the invertible Borel transformation T is defined on Ω by S(y) = σ_{t}(y) where t = r_{1}(y), the first return time to Ω. The functions r_{n}(y) restrict to Borel functions on Ω and satisfy the cocycle relation:

$$r_{m+n} = r_m + \tau^m(r_n),$$

where τ is the automorphism induced by T. The hitting number N_{t}(x) for the flow S_{t} on X is defined as the integer N such that t lies in [r_{N}(x),r_{N+1}(x)). It is an integer-valued Borel function on R × X satisfying the cocycle identity

$$N_{s+t} = N_s + \sigma_s(N_t).$$

The function h = r_{1} is a strictly positive Borel function on Ω so formally the flow can be reconstructed from the transformation T using h a ceiling function. The missing T-invariant measure class on Ω will be recovered using the second cocycle N_{t}. Indeed, the discrete measure on Z defines a measure class on the product Z × X and the flow S_{t} on the second factor extends to a flow on the product given by

$$\rho_t(m,x)=(m+N_t(x),S_t(x)).$$

Likewise the base transformation T induces a transformation R on R × Ω defined by

$$R(s,y)=(s-h(y),T(y)).$$

These transformations are related by an invertible Borel isomorphism Φ from R × Ω onto Z × X defined by

$$\Phi(t,y)=(N_t(y),S_t(y)).$$

Its inverse Ψ from Z × X onto R × Ω is defined by

$$\Psi(m,x)=(-r_{-m}(y), S_{r_{-m}(y)}y).$$

Under these maps the flow R_{t} is carried onto translation by t on the first factor of R × Ω and, in the other direction, the invertible R is carried onto translation by -1 on Z × X. It suffices to check that the measure class on Z × X carries over onto the same measure class as some produce measure m × ν on R × Ω, where m is Lebesgue measure and ν is a probability measure on Ω with measure class invariant under T. The measure class on Z × X is invariant under R, so defines a measure class on R × Ω, invariant under translation on the first factor. On the other hand, the only measure class on R invariant under translation is Lebesgue measure, so the measure class on R × Ω is equivalent to that of m × ν for some probability measure on Ω. By construction ν is quasi-invariant under T. Unravelling this construction, it follows that the original flow is isomorphic to the flow built under the ceiling function h for the base transformation T on (Ω,ν).

The above reasoning was made with the assumption that B = A. In general A is replaced by a norm closed separable unital *-subalgebra A_{0} containing B_{0}, invariant under σ_{t} and such that σ_{t}(f) is a norm continuous function of t for any f in A_{0}. To construct A_{0}, first take a generating set for the von Neumann algebra A formed of countably many projections invariant under σ_{t} with t rational. Replace each of this countable set of projections by averages over intervals [0,N^{−1}] with respect to σ_{t}. The norm closed unital *-algebra that these generate yields A_{0}. By definition it contains B_{0} = C(Y). By the Gelfand-Naimark theorem A_{0} has the form C(X). The construction with a_{r} above applies equally well here: indeed since B_{0} is a subalgebra of A_{0}, Y is a continuous quotient of X, so a function such as a_{r} is equally well a function on X. The construction therefore carries over mutatis mutandis to A, through the quotient map.

In summary there exists a measure space (Y,λ) and an ergodic action of Z × R on M = L^{∞}(Y,λ) given by commuting actions τ^{n} and σ_{t} such that there is a τ-invariant subalgebra of M isomorphic to $\ell^\infty$(Z) and a σ-invariant subalgebra of M isomorphic to L^{∞}(R). The original ergodic flow is given by the restriction of σ to M^{τ} and the corresponding base transformation given by the restriction of τ to M^{σ}.

Given a flow, it is possible to describe how two different single base transformations that can be used to construct the flow are related. be transformed back into an action of Z on Y, i.e. into an invertible transformation T_{Y} on Y. Set-theoretically T_{Y} (x) is defined to be T^{m}(x) where m ≥ 1 is the smallest integer such that T^{m}(x) lies in X. It is straightforward to see that applying the same process to the inverse of T yields the inverse of T_{Y}. The construction can be described measure theoretically as follows. Let e = χ_{Y} in B = L^{∞}(X,ν) with ν(e) ≠ 0. Then e is an orthogonal sum of projections e_{n} defined as follows:

$$e_1= e \tau^{-1}(e),\,\, e_2=e(1-\tau^{-1}(e))\tau^{-2}(e),\,\, e_3=e (1-\tau^{-1}(e))(1-\tau^{-2}(e))\tau^{-3}(e),...$$

Then if f lies in e_{n} B, the corresponding automorphism is τ_{e}(f) = τ^{n}(f).

With these definitions two ergodic transformations τ_{1}, τ_{2} of B_{1} and B_{2} arise from the same flow provided there are non-zero projections e_{1} and e_{2} in B_{1} and B_{2} such that the systems (τ_{1})_{e_{1}}, e_{1}B_{1} and (τ_{2})_{e_{2}}, e_{2}B_{2} are isomorphic.

== See also ==
- Anosov flow
- Axiom A
