= Reversible reference system propagation algorithm =

Time-stepping algorithm in molecular dynamics

Reversible reference system propagation algorithm (r-RESPA) is a time stepping algorithm used in molecular dynamics.

It evolves the system state over time,

$$\Gamma(t) = e^{iLt}\Gamma(t=0) \,$$

where the L is the Liouville operator.
