= Hypercyclic operator =

In mathematics, especially functional analysis, a hypercyclic operator on a topological vector space X is a continuous linear operator T: X → X such that there is a vector x ∈ X for which the sequence {T^{n} x: n = 0, 1, 2, …} is dense in the whole space X. In other words, the smallest closed invariant subset containing x is the whole space. Such an x is then called hypercyclic vector. There is no hypercyclic operator in finite-dimensional spaces, but the property of hypercyclicity in spaces of infinite dimension is not a rare phenomenon: many operators are hypercyclic.

The hypercyclicity is a special case of broader notions of topological transitivity (see topological mixing), and universality. Universality in general involves a set of mappings from one topological space to another (instead of a sequence of powers of a single operator mapping from X to X), but has a similar meaning to hypercyclicity. Examples of universal objects were discovered already in 1914 by Julius Pál, in 1935 by Józef Marcinkiewicz, or MacLane in 1952. However, it was not until the 1980s when hypercyclic operators started to be more intensively studied.

== Examples ==
An example of a hypercyclic operator is two times the backward shift operator on the ℓ^{2} sequence space, that is, the operator which takes a sequence

(a_{1}, a_{2}, a_{3}, …) ∈ ℓ^{2}

to the sequence

(2a_{2}, 2a_{3}, 2a_{4}, …) ∈ ℓ^{2}.

This was proved in 1969 by Rolewicz.

== Known results ==
- On every infinite-dimensional separable Fréchet space there is a hypercyclic operator. On the other hand, there is no hypercyclic operator on a finite-dimensional space, nor on a non-separable space.
- If x is a hypercyclic vector, then T^{n}x is hypercyclic as well, so there is always a dense set of hypercyclic vectors.
- Moreover, the set of hypercyclic vectors is a connected G_{δ} set when X is a metrizable space, and always contains a dense vector space, up to {0}.
- Charles Read (1988) constructed an operator on ℓ^{1}, such that all the non-zero vectors are hypercyclic, providing a counterexample to the invariant subspace problem (and even the invariant subset problem) in the class of Banach spaces. The problem, whether such an operator (sometimes called hypertransitive, or orbit transitive) exists on a separable Hilbert space, is still open (as of 2022).

== See also ==
- Topological mixing
