= Conservative system =

Theory in physics and mathematics

In physics and mathematics, a conservative system is a dynamical system which stands in contrast to a dissipative system. Roughly speaking, such systems have no friction or other mechanism to dissipate the dynamics, and thus, their phase space does not shrink over time. Precisely speaking, they are those dynamical systems that have a null wandering set: under time evolution, no portion of the phase space ever "wanders away", never to be returned to or revisited. Alternately, conservative systems are those to which the Poincaré recurrence theorem applies. An important special case of conservative systems are the measure-preserving dynamical systems.

== Informal introduction ==
Informally, dynamical systems describe the time evolution of the phase space of some mechanical system. Commonly, such evolution is given by some differential equations, or quite often in terms of discrete time steps. However, in the present case, instead of focusing on the time evolution of discrete points, one shifts attention to the time evolution of collections of points. One such example would be Saturn's rings: rather than tracking the time evolution of individual grains of sand in the rings, one is instead interested in the time evolution of the density of the rings: how the density thins out, spreads, or becomes concentrated. Over short time-scales (hundreds of thousands of years), Saturn's rings are stable, and are thus a reasonable example of a conservative system and more precisely, a measure-preserving dynamical system. It is measure-preserving, as the number of particles in the rings does not change, and, per Newtonian orbital mechanics, the phase space is incompressible: it can be stretched or squeezed, but not shrunk (this is the content of Liouville's theorem).

== Formal definitions ==
Formally, a measurable dynamical system is conservative if and only if it is non-singular, and has no wandering sets.

A measurable dynamical system (X, Σ, μ, τ) is a Borel space (X, Σ) equipped with a sigma-finite measure μ and a transformation τ. Here, X is a set, and Σ is a sigma-algebra on X, so that the pair (X, Σ) is a measurable space. μ is a sigma-finite measure on the sigma-algebra. The space X is the phase space of the dynamical system.

A transformation (a map) $\tau: X \to X$ is said to be Σ-measurable if and only if, for every σ ∈ Σ, one has $\tau^{-1}\sigma \in \Sigma$. The transformation is a single "time-step" in the evolution of the dynamical system. One is interested in invertible transformations, so that the current state of the dynamical system came from a well-defined past state.

A measurable transformation $\tau: X \to X$ is called non-singular when $\mu(\tau^{-1}\sigma)=0$ if and only if $\mu(\sigma)=0$. In this case, the system (X, Σ, μ, τ) is called a non-singular dynamical system. The condition of being non-singular is necessary for a dynamical system to be suitable for modeling (non-equilibrium) systems. That is, if a certain configuration of the system is "impossible" (i.e. $\mu(\sigma)=0$) then it must stay "impossible" (was always impossible: $\mu(\tau^{-1}\sigma)=0$), but otherwise, the system can evolve arbitrarily. Non-singular systems preserve the negligible sets, but are not required to preserve any other class of sets. The sense of the word singular here is the same as in the definition of a singular measure in that no portion of $\mu$ is singular with respect to $\mu\circ\tau^{-1}$ and vice versa.

A non-singular dynamical system for which $\mu(\tau^{-1}\sigma)=\mu(\sigma)$ for all σ ∈ Σ is called invariant, or, more commonly, a measure-preserving dynamical system.

A non-singular dynamical system is conservative if, for every set $\sigma\in\Sigma$ of positive measure there exists some $n\in \mathbb{N}$ such that $\mu(\sigma\cap\tau^{-n} \sigma) > 0$. Informally, this can be interpreted as saying that the current state of the system revisits or comes arbitrarily close to a prior state; see Poincaré recurrence for more.

A non-singular transformation $\tau: X \to X$ is incompressible if, whenever one has $\tau^{-1}\sigma\subset\sigma$, then $\mu(\sigma \smallsetminus \tau^{-1}\sigma)=0$.

== Properties ==
For a non-singular transformation $\tau: X \to X$, the following statements are equivalent:

- τ is conservative.
- τ is incompressible.
- Every wandering set of τ is null.
- For all sets σ of positive measure, $\mu\left(\sigma\smallsetminus\bigcup_{n=1}^\infty\tau^{-n}\sigma\right)=0$.

The above implies that, if $\mu(X)<\infty$ and $\tau$ is measure-preserving, then the dynamical system is conservative. This is effectively the modern statement of the Poincaré recurrence theorem. A sketch of a proof of the equivalence of these four properties is given in the article on the Hopf decomposition.

Suppose that $\mu(X)<\infty$ and $\tau$ is measure-preserving. Let $A$ be a wandering set of $\tau$. By definition of wandering sets and since $\tau$ preserves $\mu$, $X$ would thus contain a countably infinite union of pairwise disjoint sets that have the same $\mu$-measure as $A$. Since it was assumed $\mu(X)<\infty$, it follows that $A$ is a null set, and so all wandering sets must be null sets.

This argumentation fails for even the simplest examples if $\mu(X)=\infty$. Indeed, consider for instance $(X, \mathcal A, \mu)=(\mathbb R, \mathcal B(\mathbb R), \lambda)$, where $\lambda$ denotes the Lebesgue measure, and consider the shift operator $\tau: X\to X, x\mapsto x+1$. Since the Lebesgue measure is translation-invariant, $\tau$ is measure-preserving. However, $(X, \mathcal A, \mu,\tau)$ is not conservative. In fact, every interval of length strictly less than $1$ contained in $X$ is wandering. In particular, $X$ can be written as a countable union of wandering sets.

=== Hopf decomposition ===
The Hopf decomposition states that every measure space with a non-singular transformation can be decomposed into an invariant conservative set and a wandering (dissipative) set. A commonplace informal example of Hopf decomposition is the mixing of two liquids (some textbooks mention rum and coke): The initial state, where the two liquids are not yet mixed, can never recur again after mixing; it is part of the dissipative set. Likewise any of the partially-mixed states. The result, after mixing (a cuba libre, in the canonical example), is stable, and forms the conservative set; further mixing does not alter it. In this example, the conservative set is also ergodic: if one added one more drop of liquid (say, lemon juice), it would not stay in one place, but would come to mix in everywhere. One word of caution about this example: although mixing systems are ergodic, ergodic systems are not in general mixing systems! Mixing implies an interaction which may not exist. The canonical example of an ergodic system that does not mix is irrational rotation of a circle.

=== Ergodic decomposition ===
The ergodic decomposition theorem states, roughly, that every conservative system can be split up into components, each component of which is individually ergodic. An informal example of this would be a tub, with a divider down the middle, with liquids filling each compartment. The liquid on one side can clearly mix with itself, and so can the other, but, due to the partition, the two sides cannot interact. Clearly, this can be treated as two independent systems; leakage between the two sides, of measure zero, can be ignored. The ergodic decomposition theorem states that all conservative systems can be split into such independent parts, and that this splitting is unique (up to differences of measure zero). Thus, by convention, the study of conservative systems becomes the study of their ergodic components.

Formally, every ergodic system is conservative. Recall that an invariant set σ ∈ Σ is one for which τ(σ) = σ. For an ergodic system, the only invariant sets are those with measure zero or with full measure (are null or are conull); that they are conservative then follows trivially from this.

When τ is ergodic, the following statements are equivalent:

- τ is conservative and ergodic
- For all measurable sets σ, $\mu\left(X\smallsetminus\bigcup_{n=1}^\infty\tau^{-n}\sigma\right) = 0$; that is, σ "sweeps out" all of X.
- For all sets σ of positive measure, and for almost every $x\in X$, there exists a positive integer n such that $\tau^n x\in\sigma$.
- For all sets $\sigma$ and $\rho$ of positive measure, there exists a positive integer n such that $\mu\left(\tau^{-n}\rho\cap\sigma\right)>0$
- If $\tau^{-1}\sigma\subset\sigma$, then either $\mu(\sigma)=0$ or the complement has zero measure: $\mu(\sigma^c)=0$.

== See also ==
- KMS state, a description of thermodynamic equilibrium in quantum mechanical systems; dual to modular theories for von Neumann algebras.
