= Hopf decomposition =

Type of mathematical method

In mathematics, the Hopf decomposition, named after Eberhard Hopf, gives a canonical decomposition of a measure space (X, μ) with respect to an invertible non-singular transformation T:X→X, i.e. a transformation which with its inverse is measurable and carries null sets onto null sets. Up to null sets, X can be written as a disjoint union C ∐ D of T-invariant sets where the action of T on C is conservative and the action of T on D is dissipative. Thus, if τ is the automorphism of A = L^{∞}(X) induced by T, there is a unique τ-invariant projection p in A such that pA is conservative and (I–p)A is dissipative.

== Definitions ==
- Wandering sets and dissipative actions. A measurable subset W of X is wandering if its characteristic function q = χ_{W} in A = L^{∞}(X) satisfies qτ^{n}(q) = 0 for all n; thus, up to null sets, the translates T^{n}(W) are pairwise disjoint. An action is called dissipative if X = ∐ T^{n}(W) a.e. for some wandering set W.
- Conservative actions. If X has no wandering subsets of positive measure, the action is said to be conservative.
- Incompressible actions. An action is said to be incompressible if whenever a measurable subset Z satisfies T(Z) ⊆ Z then Z \ TZ has measure zero. Thus if q = χ_{Z} and τ(q) ≤ q, then τ(q) = q a.e.
- Recurrent actions. An action T is said to be recurrent if q ≤ τ(q) ∨ τ^{2}(q) ∨ τ^{3}(q) ∨ ... a.e. for any q = χ_{Y}.
- Infinitely recurrent actions. An action T is said to be infinitely recurrent if q ≤ τ^{m} (q) ∨ τ^{m + 1}(q) ∨ τ^{m+2}(q) ∨ ... a.e. for any q = χ_{Y} and any m ≥ 1.

== Recurrence theorem ==
Theorem. If T is an invertible transformation on a measure space (X,μ) preserving null sets, then the following conditions are equivalent on T (or its inverse):

1. T is conservative;
2. T is recurrent;
3. T is infinitely recurrent;
4. T is incompressible.

Since T is dissipative if and only if T^{−1} is dissipative, it follows that T is conservative if and only if T^{−1} is conservative.

If T is conservative, then r = q ∧ (τ(q) ∨ τ^{2}(q) ∨ τ^{3}(q) ∨ ⋅⋅⋅)^{⊥} = q ∧ τ(1 - q) ∧ τ^{2}(1 -q) ∧ τ^{3}(q) ∧ ... is wandering so that if q < 1, necessarily r = 0. Hence q ≤ τ(q) ∨ τ^{2}(q) ∨ τ^{3}(q) ∨ ⋅⋅⋅, so that T is recurrent.

If T is recurrent, then q ≤ τ(q) ∨ τ^{2}(q) ∨ τ^{3}(q) ∨ ⋅⋅⋅ Now assume by induction that q ≤ τ^{k}(q) ∨ τ^{k+1}(q) ∨ ⋅⋅⋅. Then τ^{k}(q) ≤ τ^{k+1}(q) ∨ τ^{k+2}(q) ∨ ⋅⋅⋅ ≤ . Hence q ≤ τ^{k+1}(q) ∨ τ^{k+2}(q) ∨ ⋅⋅⋅. So the result holds for k+1 and thus T is infinitely recurrent. Conversely by definition an infinitely recurrent transformation is recurrent.

Now suppose that T is recurrent. To show that T is incompressible it must be shown that, if τ(q) ≤ q, then τ(q) ≤ q. In fact in this case τ^{n}(q) is a decreasing sequence. But by recurrence, q ≤ τ(q) ∨ τ^{2}(q) ∨ τ^{3}(q) ∨ ⋅⋅⋅ , so q ≤ τ(q) and hence q = τ(q).

Finally suppose that T is incompressible. If T is not conservative there is a p ≠ 0 in A with the τ^{n}(p) disjoint (orthogonal). But then q = p ⊕ τ(p) ⊕ τ^{2}(p) ⊕ ⋅⋅⋅ satisfies τ(q) < q with q − τ(q) = p ≠ 0, contradicting incompressibility. So T is conservative.

== Hopf decomposition ==
Theorem. If T is an invertible transformation on a measure space (X,μ) preserving null sets and inducing an automorphism τ of A = L^{∞}(X), then there is a unique τ-invariant p = χ_{C} in A such that τ is conservative on pA = L^{∞}(C) and dissipative on (1 − p)A = L^{∞}(D) where D = X \ C.

Without loss of generality it can be assumed that μ is a probability measure. If T is conservative there is nothing to prove, since in that case C = X. Otherwise there is a wandering set W for T. Let r = χ_{W} and q = ⊕ τ^{n}(r). Thus q is τ-invariant and dissipative. Moreover μ(q) > 0. Clearly an orthogonal direct sum of such τ-invariant dissipative q′s is also τ-invariant and dissipative; and if q is τ-invariant and dissipative and r < q is τ-invariant, then r is dissipative. Hence if q_{1} and q_{2} are τ-invariant and dissipative, then q_{1} ∨ q_{2} is τ-invariant and dissipative, since q_{1} ∨ q_{2} = q_{1} ⊕ q_{2}(1 − q_{1}). Now let M be the supremum of all μ(q) with q τ-invariant and dissipative. Take q_{n} τ-invariant and dissipative such that μ(q_{n}) increases to M. Replacing q_{n} by q_{1} ∨ ⋅⋅⋅ ∨ q_{n}, t can be assumed that q_{n} is increasing to q say. By continuity q is τ-invariant and μ(q) = M. By maximality p = I − q is conservative. Uniqueness is clear since no τ-invariant r < p is dissipative and every τ-invariant r < q is dissipative.

Corollary. The Hopf decomposition for T coincides with the Hopf decomposition for T^{−1}.

Since a transformation is dissipative on a measure space if and only if its inverse is dissipative, the dissipative parts of T and T^{−1} coincide. Hence so do the conservative parts.

Corollary. The Hopf decomposition for T coincides with the Hopf decomposition for T^{n} for n > 1.

If W is a wandering set for T then it is a wandering set for T^{n}. So the dissipative part of T is contained in the dissipative part of T^{n}. Let σ = τ^{n}. To prove the converse, it suffices to show that if σ is dissipative, then τ is dissipative. If not, using the Hopf decomposition, it can be assumed that σ is dissipative and τ conservative. Suppose that p is a non-zero wandering projection for σ. Then τ^{a}(p) and τ^{b}(p) are orthogonal for different a and b in the same congruence class modulo n. Take a set of τ^{a}(p) with non-zero product and maximal size. Thus |S| ≤ n. By maximality, r is wandering for τ, a contradiction.

Corollary. If an invertible transformation T acts ergodically but non-transitively on the measure space (X,μ) preserving null sets and B is a subset with μ(B) > 0, then the complement of B ∪ TB ∪ T^{2}B ∪ ⋅⋅⋅ has measure zero.

Note that ergodicity and non-transitivity imply that the action of T is conservative and hence infinitely recurrent. But then B ≤ T^{m} (B) ∨ T^{m + 1}(B) ∨ T^{m+2}(B) ∨ ... for any m ≥ 1. Applying T^{−m}, it follows that T^{−m}(B) lies in Y = B ∪ TB ∪ T^{2}B ∪ ⋅⋅⋅ for every m > 0. By ergodicity μ(X \ Y) = 0.

== Hopf decomposition for a non-singular flow ==
Let (X,μ) be a measure space and S_{t} a non-sngular flow on X inducing a 1-parameter group of automorphisms σ_{t} of A = L^{∞}(X). It will be assumed that the action is faithful, so that σ_{t} is the identity only for t = 0. For each S_{t} or equivalently σ_{t} with t ≠ 0 there is a Hopf decomposition, so a p_{t} fixed by σ_{t} such that the action is conservative on p_{t}A and dissipative on (1−p_{t})A.

- For s, t ≠ 0 the conservative and dissipative parts of S_{s} and S_{t} coincide if s/t is rational.

This follows from the fact that for any non-singular invertible transformation the conservative and dissipative parts of T and T^{n} coincide for n ≠ 0.

- If S_{1} is dissipative on A = L^{∞}(X), then there is an invariant measure λ on A and p in A such that

1. p > σ_{t}(p) for all t > 0
2. λ(p – σ_{t}(p)) = t for all t > 0
3. σ_{t}(p) $\uparrow$ 1 as t tends to −∞ and σ_{t}(p) $\downarrow$ 0 as t tends to +∞.

Let T = S_{1}. Take q a wandering set for T so that ⊕ τ^{n}(q) = 1. Changing μ to an equivalent measure, it can be assumed that μ(q) = 1, so that μ restricts to a probability measure on qA. Transporting this measure to τ^{n}(q)A, it can further be assumed that μ is τ-invariant on A. But then λ = ∫^{1}_{0} μ ∘ σ_{t} dt is an equivalent σ-invariant measure on A which can be rescaled if necessary so that λ(q) = 1. The r in A that are wandering for Τ (or τ) with ⊕ τ^{n}(r) = 1 are easily described: they are given by r = ⊕ τ^{n}(q_{n}) where q = ⊕ q_{n} is a decomposition of q. In particular λ(r) =1. Moreover if p satisfies p > τ(p) and τ^{–n}(p) $\uparrow$ 1, then λ(p– τ(p)) = 1, applying the result to r = p – τ(p). The same arguments show that conversely, if r is wandering for τ and λ(r) = 1, then ⊕ τ^{n}(r) = 1.

Let Q = q ⊕ τ(q) ⊕ τ^{2} (q) ⊕ ⋅⋅⋅ so that τ^{k} (Q) < Q for k ≥ 1. Then a = ∫^{∞}_{0} σ_{t}(q) dt = Σ_{k≥0} ∫^{1}_{0} σ_{k+t}(q) dt = ∫^{1}_{0} σ_{t}(Q) dt so that 0 ≤ a ≤ 1 in A. By definition σ_{s}(a) ≤ a for s ≥ 0, since a − σ_{s}(a) = ∫^{∞}_{s} σ_{t}(q) dt. The same formulas show that σ_{s}(a) tends 0 or 1 as s tends to +∞ or −∞. Set p = χ_{[ε,1]}(a) for 0 < ε < 1. Then σ_{s}(p) = χ_{[ε,1]}(σ_{s}(a)). It follows immediately that σ_{s}(p) ≤ p for s ≥ 0. Moreover σ_{s}(p) $\downarrow$ 0 as s tends to +∞ and σ_{s}(p) $\uparrow$ 1 as s tends to − ∞. The first limit formula follows because 0 ≤ ε ⋅ σ_{s}(p) ≤ σ_{s}(a). Now the same reasoning can be applied to τ^{−1}, σ_{−t}, τ^{−1}(q) and 1 – ε in place of τ, σ_{t}, q and ε. Then it is easily checked that the quantities corresponding to a and p are 1 − a and 1 − p. Consequently σ_{−t}(1−p) $\downarrow$ 0 as t tends to ∞. Hence σ_{s}(p) $\uparrow$ 1 as s tends to − ∞. In particular p ≠ 0 , 1.

So r = p − τ(p) is wandering for τ and ⊕ τ^{k}(r) = 1. Hence λ(r) = 1. It follows that λ(p −σ_{s}(p) ) = s for s = 1/n and therefore for all rational s > 0. Since the family σ_{s}(p) is continuous and decreasing, by continuity the same formula also holds for all real s > 0. Hence p satisfies all the asserted conditions.

- The conservative and dissipative parts of S_{t} for t ≠ 0 are independent of t.

The previous result shows that if S_{t} is dissipative on X for t ≠ 0 then so is every S_{s} for s ≠ 0. By uniqueness, S_{t} and S_{s} preserve the dissipative parts of the other. Hence each is dissipative on the dissipative part of the other, so the dissipative parts agree. Hence the conservative parts agree.

== See also ==
- Ergodic flow
