= Yoichiro Nambu =

Japanese-American nobel-winning physicist

- 南部 陽一郎
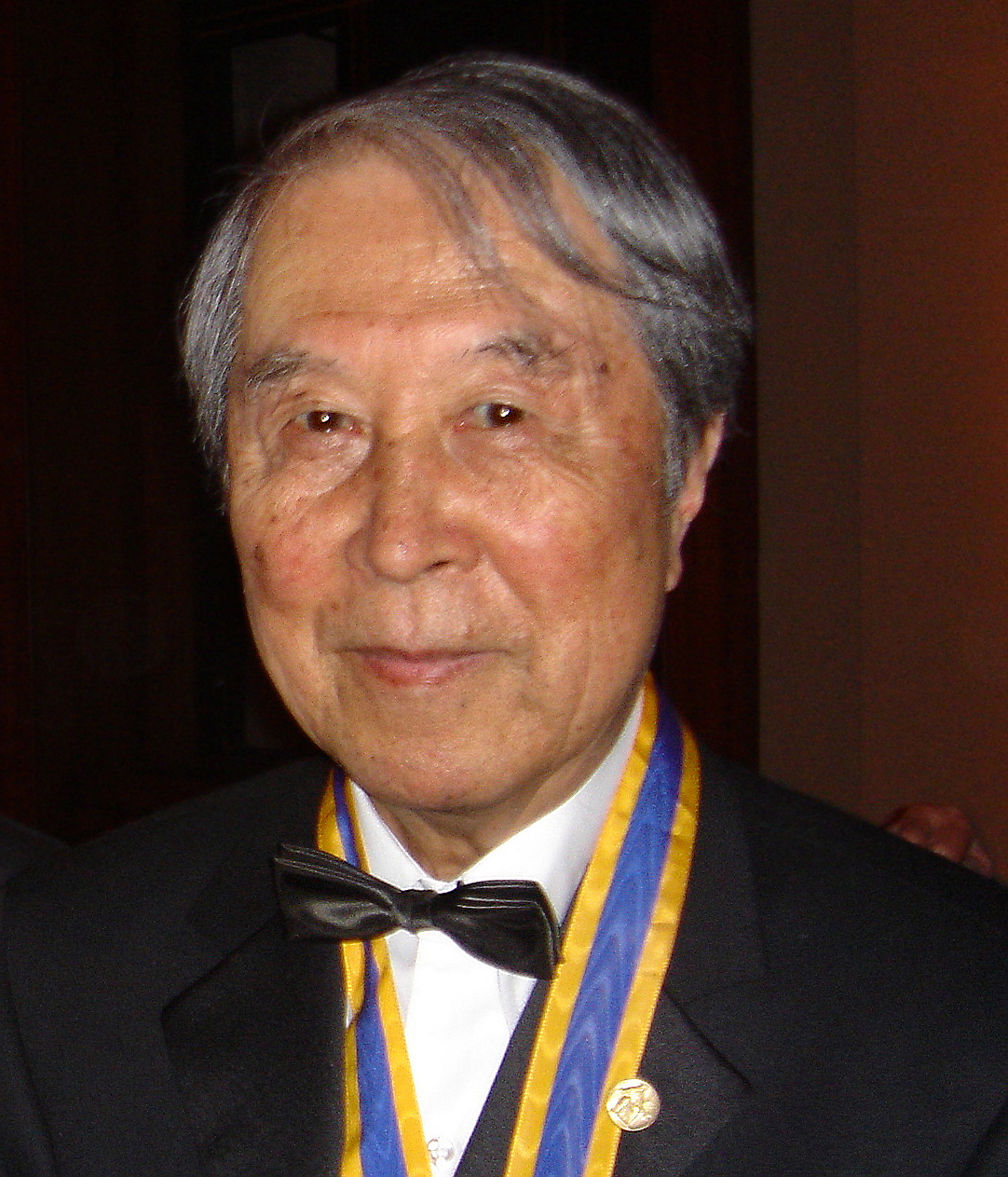
- Nambu in 2005
- Born: 18 January 1921; Tokyo, Japan
- Died: 5 July 2015 (aged 94); Toyonaka, Osaka, Japan
- Citizenship: American (from 1970)
- Education: Tokyo Imperial University
- Known for: Spontaneous symmetry breaking String theory Nambu–Goto action Nambu–Goldstone boson Nambu mechanics Nambu–Jona-Lasinio model
- Spouse: Chieko Hida
- Children: John Nambu (son)
- Awards: Heineman Prize (1970); J. Robert Oppenheimer Memorial Prize (1976); Order of Culture of Japan (1978); US National Medal of Science (1982); Max Planck Medal (1985); Dirac Medal (1986); J.J. Sakurai Prize (1994); Wolf Prize in Physics (1994/1995); Franklin Medal (2005); Pomeranchuk Prize (2007); Nobel Prize in Physics (2008)
- Scientific career
- Fields: Physics
- Workplaces: IJA Research Institute of Technology (IJA 4th Research Institute of Aeronautical Technology) (1943–45); University of Tokyo (1945–49); Osaka City University (1949–52); Institute for Advanced Study (1952–54); University of Chicago (1954–2015); Ritsumeikan University (1994); Ritsumeikan Asia Pacific University (1994–2015); Osaka University (1996–2015); Osaka Metropolitan University (2013–2015)

Yoichiro Nambu (南部 陽一郎, Nanbu Yōichirō; 18 January 1921 – 5 July 2015) was a Japanese-American physicist and professor at the University of Chicago.

Known for his groundbreaking contributions to theoretical physics, Nambu was the originator of the theory of spontaneous symmetry breaking, a concept that revolutionized particle physics. He was also a pioneer of quantum chromodynamics (QCD), one of the founding figures of string theory, and the proposer of Nambu mechanics. In addition, he co-created the Nambu–Jona-Lasinio model, which explained the dynamical origin of mass in nucleons.

He was awarded half of the Nobel Prize in Physics in 2008 for the discovery in 1960 of the mechanism of spontaneous broken symmetry in subatomic physics, related at first to the strong interaction's chiral symmetry and later to the electroweak interaction and Higgs mechanism. The other half was split equally between Makoto Kobayashi and Toshihide Maskawa "for the discovery of the origin of the broken symmetry which predicts the existence of at least three families of quarks in nature".

== Early life and education ==
Yoichiro Nambu was born on January 18, 1921, in Tokyo, Empire of Japan. In 1923, when Tokyo was devastated by the Great Kanto Earthquake, the Nambu family relocated to Fukui Prefecture, the hometown of his father. Nambu spent the rest of his childhood there and completed his high school education by age 17.

During his youth, he built a crystal radio set by himself. He later recalled being deeply moved when he was able to listen to a live baseball broadcast through the device, an early moment of fascination with science and technology.

After graduating from high school, Nambu was admitted to the prestigious First Higher School (Ichikō), a preparatory institution for elite universities in Japan. Despite his later achievements in theoretical physics, he struggled with physics during this time. He especially had difficulty understanding the concept of entropy and failed his thermodynamics course.

He went on to study at the Tokyo Imperial University (now the University of Tokyo), where Chushiro Hayashi—later known for his foundational work in astrophysics—was one of his classmates. In his senior year, Nambu expressed interest in studying elementary particles and approached Hideki Yukawa and Shin'ichirō Tomonaga for guidance. However, he was initially turned away, being told, "Only geniuses can understand particle physics."

== Career ==
After receiving his Bachelor of Science in 1942, Nambu was drafted into the Imperial Japanese Army in 1942. He served for one year as a lieutenant (technical lieutenant 技術中尉), engaged in tasks such as digging trenches and ferrying boats, before being assigned to a research unit focused on shortwave radar development. During this period, he was ordered by the army to obtain a top-secret naval document written by Shin'ichirō Tomonaga on radar theory. Rather than resorting to espionage, Nambu directly approached Tomonaga and obtained the material with his cooperation.

Following the war, from 1945 to 1949, Nambu worked at the University of Tokyo's Faculty of Physics. During this time, he was strongly influenced by Tomonaga's work on quantum electrodynamics and Ryogo Kubo's studies in condensed matter physics. He earned his Doctor of Science degree in 1952.

In 1949, Nambu was appointed as an associate professor at Osaka City University (now Osaka Metropolitan University) and became a full professor the following year at the age of 29. In 1952, he was invited to the Institute for Advanced Study in Princeton, New Jersey, and moved to the United States. During his time there, he met Albert Einstein twice. On the second occasion, Einstein fervently attempted to explain to Nambu his deep skepticism of quantum mechanics.

In 1954, Nambu joined the University of Chicago and was promoted to full professor in 1958. From 1974 to 1977, he served as Chair of the Department of Physics. He became a U.S. citizen in 1970 and remained one until his death in 2015.

== Research ==
Nambu's research focused on quantum electrodynamics, elementary particle physics, quantum field theory, scattering theory, crystal statistics, and the theory of superconductivity. After more than fifty years as a professor, he was Henry Pratt Judson Distinguished Service Professor emeritus at the University of Chicago's Department of Physics and Enrico Fermi Institute.

=== Spontaneous symmetry breaking ===
In 1960, he proposed the idea of spontaneous symmetry breaking (based on a formal analogy he observed between the Bogoliubov–Valatin equations, known in the BCS theory of superconductivity, and the Dirac equation), and also proposed the hypothesis of partial conservation of the weak axial current of hadrons.

This concept provided the essential theoretical underpinning for what would eventually become the Higgs mechanism in the Standard Model, influencing the way physicists understand the origin of mass and phase transitions in field theory.

=== Nambu–Jona-Lasinio model ===
In 1961, Nambu, in two papers co-authored with Italian physicist Giovanni Jona-Lasinio, proposed a theoretical model (now known as the Nambu–Jona-Lasinio model), in which he attempted to explain the origin of nucleon mass through the mechanism of spontaneous chiral symmetry breaking. Later, this model was reformulated by other researchers within the framework of the quark theory of hadron structure. It turned out to be an effective computational tool for describing low-energy hadron physics, enabling, in particular, the description of mass spectra and decays of the ground states of meson nonets, as well as the study of hadron behavior in hot and dense media (which is relevant, for example, in the study of quark–gluon plasma).

The NJL model was later adapted by others into the framework of quark-based hadron structure theory. It proved to be a powerful computational tool for describing low-energy hadron physics, including meson mass spectra, decay modes, and behavior in hot and dense media such as the quark–gluon plasma.

=== Nambu–Goldstone theorem ===
In 1964, Nambu provided a general mathematical proof of the Goldstone theorem. The massless bosons arising in field theories with spontaneous symmetry breaking are sometimes referred to as Nambu–Goldstone bosons.

This theorem became a central feature of many quantum field theories and models of spontaneous symmetry breaking.

=== Quantum chromodynamics ===
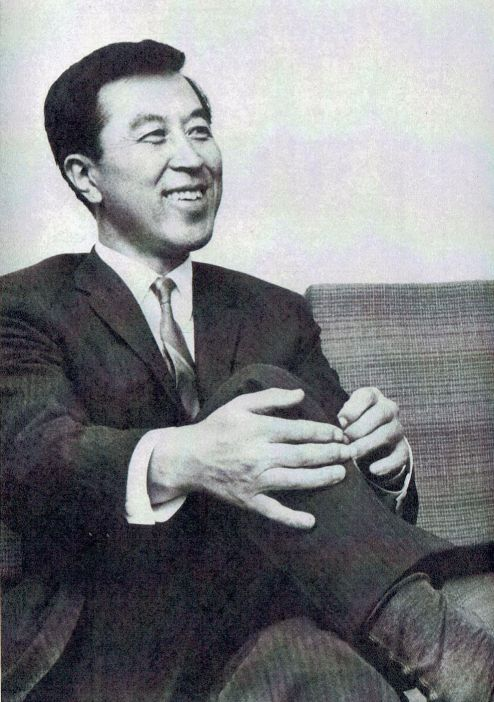
Yoichiro Nambu was interviewed by the Asahi Shimbun in 1965.

In 1965, within a short interval, three works were published — a preprint by Nikolay Bogolyubov, Boris Struminsky, and Albert Tavkhelidze; a paper by Yoneji Miyamoto (宮本米二); and a paper by Moo-Young Han and Nambu. In these papers, the authors, analyzing various problems in quark theory, independently arrived at the idea that quarks possess a previously unknown quantum number (named "color charge" by Murray Gell-Mann and Harald Fritzsch in 1971). They also developed a model of strong interactions based on three triplets of quarks with integer electric charges. Nambu proposed the idea of "color charge" of quantum chromodynamics, building on his earlier work on spontaneous symmetry breaking in particle physics.

Although later versions of the Standard Model adopted fractional charges, Nambu's proposal of color as a quantum degree of freedom laid the conceptual groundwork for the development of quantum chromodynamics (QCD), the modern theory of strong interactions.

=== String theory ===
In the early 1970s, Nambu independently discovered that the dual resonance model, originally introduced to describe hadronic scattering amplitudes, could be reinterpreted as a theory of quantized relativistic strings. This insight provided the first theoretical framework in which extended one-dimensional objects, rather than point particles, were used to explain the behavior of fundamental interactions. His reformulation laid the groundwork for the development of bosonic string theory, and he is widely recognized as one of the founding figures of string theory.

One of his key contributions was the introduction of the action principle for strings, now known as the Nambu–Goto action, which describes the dynamics of a relativistic string as the area of the worldsheet swept out in spacetime. This formalism became a central component of modern string theory, influencing later developments in superstring theory, M-theory, and attempts to unify quantum mechanics with general relativity.

=== Nambu mechanics ===
In 1973, Nambu proposed a generalization of Hamiltonian mechanics now known as Nambu mechanics. This formulation extended classical dynamics by introducing multiple Hamiltonian functions and a higher-order structure called the Nambu bracket. Unlike traditional Hamiltonian systems that use a single Hamiltonian and a Poisson bracket, Nambu mechanics allows the evolution of physical systems to be described using ternary (or higher) brackets with multiple conserved quantities.

Though initially overlooked, Nambu mechanics later gained attention in the study of non-linear systems, fluid dynamics, and higher-dimensional theoretical frameworks. It has influenced areas such as quantum Nambu brackets, generalized integrable systems, and has been discussed in the context of string theory and M-theory as a potential mathematical structure underlying extended objects like membranes.

=== Other early contributions in particle physics ===
Nambu's early work laid essential groundwork for his later breakthroughs:

- In 1951, he independently proposed the concept of associative production of strange particles, explaining their appearance in high-energy collisions.
- In 1957, he predicted the existence of the vector omega meson, and derived a fundamental relation known as crossing symmetry, which became a key tool in analyzing particle interactions.

== Later career in Japan ==
In 1994, Yoichiro Nambu was appointed as a visiting professor at Ritsumeikan University and an academic advisor at Ritsumeikan Asia Pacific University. That same year, the two institutions established the Yoichiro Nambu Research Encouragement Fund. In 1996, he received the first honorary doctorate awarded by Osaka University (UOsaka), and in 2006, he became a specially appointed professor there. He held a research office on the UOsaka Toyonaka Campus.

On November 12, 2010, Nambu made a special appearance at a celebration held for Purdue University professor Ei-ichi Negishi, who had received the 2010 Nobel Prize in Chemistry. Both men were Japanese Nobel laureates residing in the American Midwest and alumni of the University of Tokyo.

In 2011, Nambu returned to Japan and settled permanently in Toyonaka, Osaka Prefecture. He continued his affiliation with Osaka University. The Nambu Hall was opened on the second floor of the J Building, Graduate School of Science, in 2017.

Nambu also held the titles of Honorary Professor and Special Distinguished Professor at Osaka City University (now Osaka Metropolitan University). The university later established the Nambu Yoichiro Institute of Theoretical and Experimental Physics (NITEP) on November 1, 2018.

== Family and popular culture ==
Yoichiro's father, Kichiro Nambu (南部 吉郎, Nanbu Kichirō), was originally from Fukui and attended Ritsumeikan Middle School before going on to study literature at Waseda University. His graduation thesis focused on William Blake, the English poet, painter, and printmaker. The following year, in 1921, Yoichiro was born in Tokyo. However, after the Great Kanto Earthquake struck in 1923, the family of three returned to Fukui, where Kichiro took up a position as an English teacher at Fukui Girls' High School.

The name of Dr. Kozaburo Nambu (南部 考三郎, Nanbu Kōzaburō), one of the main characters in the famous Japanese anime Science Ninja Team Gatchaman, was inspired by Yoichiro Nambu.

== Death ==
Nambu died of heart failure at the hospital in Osaka on 5 July 2015, at the age of 94, and his death was announced 12 days later. His funeral and memorial services were held among close relatives.

Nambu was survived by his wife, Chieko, and his son, John.

== Recognition ==
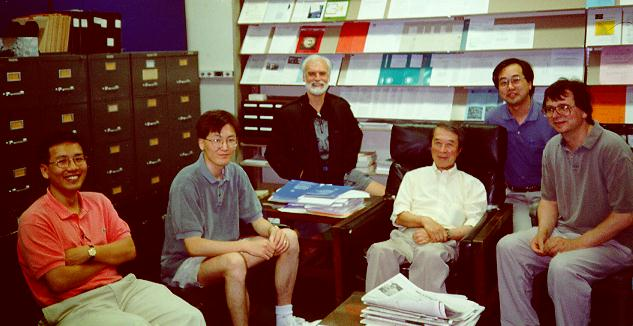
Nambu (white shirt) and associates in 1996

In 2008, although awarded the Nobel Prize in Physics, Nambu did not travel to Stockholm to attend the award ceremony. At his request, his former colleague Giovanni Jona-Lasinio traveled in his place and graciously delivered the Nobel Lecture on his behalf.

Bruno Zumino, one of the founders of supersymmetry, once remarked:

"He was always ten years ahead of us, so I tried to understand his work in order to contribute to a field that would flourish a decade later. But contrary to my expectation, it took me ten years just to understand what he had done."

Toshihide Maskawa, Nobel Prize laureate in Physics, once stated:

"Professor Nambu is the greatest physicist Japan has ever produced. I believe he stands even above Hideki Yukawa and Shin'ichirō Tomonaga." "Japan's Nobel-winning physicists are all brilliant, and I know them well—but if I had to name a true 'genius,' it would be Yoichiro Nambu."

=== Awards ===
- 1970: Dannie Heineman Prize
- 1977: J. Robert Oppenheimer Memorial Prize
- 1982: National Medal of Science
- 1985: Max Planck Medal, Germany
- 1986: Dirac Prize
- 1994: Sakurai Prize
- 1994/1995: Wolf Prize in Physics
- 2005: Benjamin Franklin Medal, Franklin Institute
- 2005: Oskar Klein Memorial Lecture
- 2007: Pomeranchuk Prize
- 2008: Nobel Prize in Physics "for the discovery of the mechanism of spontaneous broken symmetry in subatomic physics".

=== Honors ===
- 1978: Order of Culture, Japan
- 1978: Person of Cultural Merit, Japan
- 1979: Honorary Citizen of Fukui City, Japan
- 2003: Fukui Prefectural Award, Japan
- 2011: Honorary Citizen of Toyonaka City, Japan

== Bibliography ==
- Nambu, Yoichiro (1985), Quarks, Singapore: World Scientific.

== See also ==
- List of Japanese Nobel laureates
- List of Nobel laureates affiliated with the University of Tokyo
