= Symplectomorphism =

Isomorphism of symplectic manifolds

In mathematics, a symplectomorphism or symplectic map is an isomorphism in the category of symplectic manifolds. In classical mechanics, a symplectomorphism represents a transformation of phase space that is volume-preserving and preserves the symplectic structure of phase space, and is called a canonical transformation.

== Formal definition ==
A diffeomorphism between two symplectic manifolds $f: (M,\omega) \rightarrow (N,\omega')$ is called a symplectomorphism if

$$f^*\omega'=\omega,$$

where $f^*$ is the pullback of $f$. The symplectic diffeomorphisms from $M$ to $M$ are a (pseudo-)group, called the symplectomorphism group (see below).

The infinitesimal version of symplectomorphisms gives the symplectic vector fields. A vector field $X \in \Gamma^{\infty}(TM)$ is called symplectic if

$$\mathcal{L}_X\omega=0.$$

Also, $X$ is symplectic if the flow $\phi_t: M\rightarrow M$ of $X$ is a symplectomorphism for every $t$. These vector fields build a Lie subalgebra of $\Gamma^{\infty}(TM)$. Here, $\Gamma^{\infty}(TM)$ is the set of smooth vector fields on $M$, and $\mathcal{L}_X$ is the Lie derivative along the vector field $X.$

Examples of symplectomorphisms include the canonical transformations of classical mechanics and theoretical physics, the flow associated to any Hamiltonian function, the map on cotangent bundles induced by any diffeomorphism of manifolds, and the coadjoint action of an element of a Lie group on a coadjoint orbit.

== Flows ==
Any smooth function on a symplectic manifold gives rise, by definition, to a Hamiltonian vector field and the set of all such vector fields form a subalgebra of the Lie algebra of symplectic vector fields. The integration of the flow of a symplectic vector field is a symplectomorphism. Since symplectomorphisms preserve the symplectic 2-form and hence the symplectic volume form, Liouville's theorem in Hamiltonian mechanics follows. Symplectomorphisms that arise from Hamiltonian vector fields are known as Hamiltonian symplectomorphisms.

Since {H, H} = X_{H}(H) = 0, the flow of a Hamiltonian vector field also preserves H. In physics this is interpreted as the law of conservation of energy.

If the first Betti number of a connected symplectic manifold is zero, symplectic and Hamiltonian vector fields coincide, so the notions of Hamiltonian isotopy and symplectic isotopy of symplectomorphisms coincide.

It can be shown that the equations for a geodesic may be formulated as a Hamiltonian flow, see Geodesics as Hamiltonian flows.

== The group of (Hamiltonian) symplectomorphisms ==
The symplectomorphisms from a manifold back onto itself form an infinite-dimensional pseudogroup. The corresponding Lie algebra consists of symplectic vector fields. The Hamiltonian symplectomorphisms form a subgroup, whose Lie algebra is given by the Hamiltonian vector fields. The latter is isomorphic to the Lie algebra of smooth functions on the manifold with respect to the Poisson bracket, modulo the constants.

The group of Hamiltonian symplectomorphisms of $(M,\omega)$ usually denoted as $\operatorname{Ham}(M,\omega)$.

Groups of Hamiltonian diffeomorphisms are simple, by a theorem of Banyaga. They have natural geometry given by the Hofer norm. The homotopy type of the symplectomorphism group for certain simple symplectic four-manifolds, such as the product of spheres, can be computed using Gromov's theory of pseudoholomorphic curves.

== Comparison with Riemannian geometry ==
Unlike Riemannian manifolds, symplectic manifolds are not very rigid: Darboux's theorem shows that all symplectic manifolds of the same dimension are locally isomorphic. In contrast, isometries in Riemannian geometry must preserve the Riemann curvature tensor, which is thus a local invariant of the Riemannian manifold. Moreover, every function H on a symplectic manifold defines a Hamiltonian vector field X_{H}, which exponentiates to a one-parameter group of Hamiltonian diffeomorphisms. It follows that the group of symplectomorphisms is always very large, and in particular, infinite-dimensional. On the other hand, the group of isometries of a Riemannian manifold is always a (finite-dimensional) Lie group. Moreover, Riemannian manifolds with large symmetry groups are very special, and a generic Riemannian manifold has no nontrivial symmetries.

== Quantizations ==
Representations of finite-dimensional subgroups of the group of symplectomorphisms (after ħ-deformations, in general) on Hilbert spaces are called quantizations. When the Lie group is the one defined by a Hamiltonian, it is called a "quantization by energy". The corresponding operator from the Lie algebra to the Lie algebra of continuous linear operators is also sometimes called the quantization; this is a more common way of looking at it in physics.

== Arnold conjecture ==
A celebrated conjecture of Vladimir Arnold relates the minimum number of fixed points for a Hamiltonian symplectomorphism $\varphi: M \to M$, in case $M$ is a compact symplectic manifold, to Morse theory (see). More precisely, the conjecture states that $\varphi$ has at least as many fixed points as the number of critical points that a smooth function on $M$ must have. A certain weaker version of this conjecture has been proved: when $\varphi$ is "nondegenerate", the number of fixed points is bounded from below by the sum of Betti numbers of $M$ (see,). The most important development in symplectic geometry triggered by this famous conjecture is the birth of Floer homology (see), named after Andreas Floer.
