= Nambu mechanics =

Generalization of Hamiltonian mechanics involving multiple Hamiltonians

In mathematics, Nambu mechanics is a generalization of Hamiltonian mechanics involving multiple Hamiltonians. Recall that Hamiltonian mechanics is based upon the flows generated by a smooth Hamiltonian over a symplectic manifold. The flows are symplectomorphisms and hence obey Liouville's theorem. This was soon generalized to flows generated by a Hamiltonian over a Poisson manifold. In 1973, Yoichiro Nambu suggested a generalization involving Nambu–Poisson manifolds with more than one Hamiltonian. In 1994, Leon Takhtajan revisited Nambu dynamics.

== Nambu bracket ==
Specifically, consider a differential manifold M, for some integer N ≥ 2; one has a smooth N-linear map from N copies of C^{∞} (M) to itself, such that it is completely antisymmetric: the Nambu bracket,

$$\{h_1,\ldots,h_{N-1}, \cdot \} : C^\infty(M) \times \cdots C^\infty(M) \rightarrow C^\infty(M),$$

which acts as a derivation

$$\{h_1,\ldots,h_{N-1},fg\} = \{h_1,\ldots,h_{N-1},f\}g + f\{h_1,\ldots,h_{N-1},g\},$$

whence the Filippov Identities (FI) (evocative of the Jacobi identities, but unlike them, not antisymmetrized in all arguments, for N ≥ 2 ):

$\{ f_1,\cdots , ~f_{N-1},~ \{ g_1,\cdots,~ g_N\}\} = \{ \{ f_1, \cdots, ~ f_{N-1},~g_1\},~g_2,\cdots,~g_N\}+\{g_1, \{f_1,\cdots,f_{N-1}, ~g_2\},\cdots,g_N\}+\dots$ $+\{g_1,\cdots, g_{N-1},\{f_1,\cdots,f_{N-1},~g_N\}\},$

so that {f_{1}, ..., f_{N−1}, •} acts as a generalized derivation over the N-fold product {. ,..., .}.

== Hamiltonians and flow ==
There are N − 1 Hamiltonians, H_{1}, ..., H_{N−1}, generating an incompressible flow,

$$\frac{d}{dt}f = \{f, H_1, \ldots, H_{N-1}\},$$

The generalized phase-space velocity is divergenceless, enabling Liouville's theorem. The case N = 2 reduces to a Poisson manifold, and conventional Hamiltonian mechanics.

For larger even N, the N−1 Hamiltonians identify with the maximal number of independent invariants of motion (cf. Conserved quantity) characterizing a superintegrable system that evolves in N-dimensional phase space. Such systems are also describable by conventional Hamiltonian dynamics; but their description in the framework of Nambu mechanics is substantially more elegant and intuitive, as all invariants enjoy the same geometrical status as the Hamiltonian: the trajectory in phase space is the intersection of the N − 1 hypersurfaces specified by these invariants. Thus, the flow is perpendicular to all N − 1 gradients of these Hamiltonians, whence parallel to the generalized cross product specified by the respective Nambu bracket.

Nambu mechanics can be extended to fluid dynamics, where the resulting Nambu brackets are non-canonical and the Hamiltonians are identified with the Casimir of the system, such as enstrophy or helicity.

== Quantization ==
From the view point of Zariski quantization, Takhtajan et al. propose quantization of Nambu dynamics.

Quantizing Nambu dynamics leads to intriguing structures that coincide with conventional quantization ones when superintegrable systems are involved—as they must.

In relation to matrix models and M2-branes, S. Katagiri has recently discussed about quantization of Nambu dynamics.

== See also ==
- Hamiltonian mechanics
- Symplectic manifold
- Poisson manifold
- Poisson algebra
- Integrable system
- Conserved quantity
- Hamiltonian Fluid Mechanics
