= Hamiltonian fluid mechanics =

Hamiltonian fluid mechanics is the application of Hamiltonian methods to fluid mechanics. Note that this formalism only applies to non-dissipative fluids.

== Irrotational barotropic flow ==
Take the simple example of a barotropic, inviscid vorticity-free fluid.

Then, the conjugate fields are the mass density field ρ and the velocity potential φ. The Poisson bracket is given by

$$\{\rho(\vec{y}),\varphi(\vec{x})\}=\delta^d(\vec{x}-\vec{y})$$

and the Hamiltonian by:

$$H=\int \mathrm{d}^d x \mathcal{H}=\int \mathrm{d}^d x \left( \frac{1}{2}\rho(\nabla \varphi)^2 +e(\rho) \right),$$

where e is the internal energy density, as a function of ρ. For this barotropic flow, the internal energy is related to the pressure p by:

$$e'' = \frac{1}{\rho}p',$$

where an apostrophe ('), denotes differentiation with respect to ρ.

This Hamiltonian structure gives rise to the following two equations of motion:

$$\begin{align}
\frac{\partial \rho}{\partial t}&=+\frac{\partial \mathcal{H}}{\partial \varphi}= -\nabla \cdot(\rho\vec{u}),
\\
\frac{\partial \varphi}{\partial t}&=-\frac{\partial \mathcal{H}}{\partial \rho}=-\frac{1}{2}\vec{u}\cdot\vec{u}-e',
\end{align}$$

where $\vec{u}\ \stackrel{\mathrm{def}}{=}\ \nabla \varphi$ is the velocity and is vorticity-free. The second equation leads to the Euler equations:

$$\frac{\partial \vec{u}}{\partial t} + (\vec{u}\cdot\nabla) \vec{u} = -e''\nabla\rho = -\frac{1}{\rho}\nabla{p}$$

after exploiting the fact that the vorticity is zero:

$$\nabla \times\vec{u}=\vec{0}.$$

As fluid dynamics is described by non-canonical dynamics, which possess an infinite amount of Casimir invariants, an alternative formulation of Hamiltonian formulation of fluid dynamics can be introduced through the use of Nambu mechanics

== See also ==
- Luke's variational principle
- Hamiltonian field theory
