= Osaka City University =

Public university in Japan

Osaka City University (OCU)
- 大阪市立大学
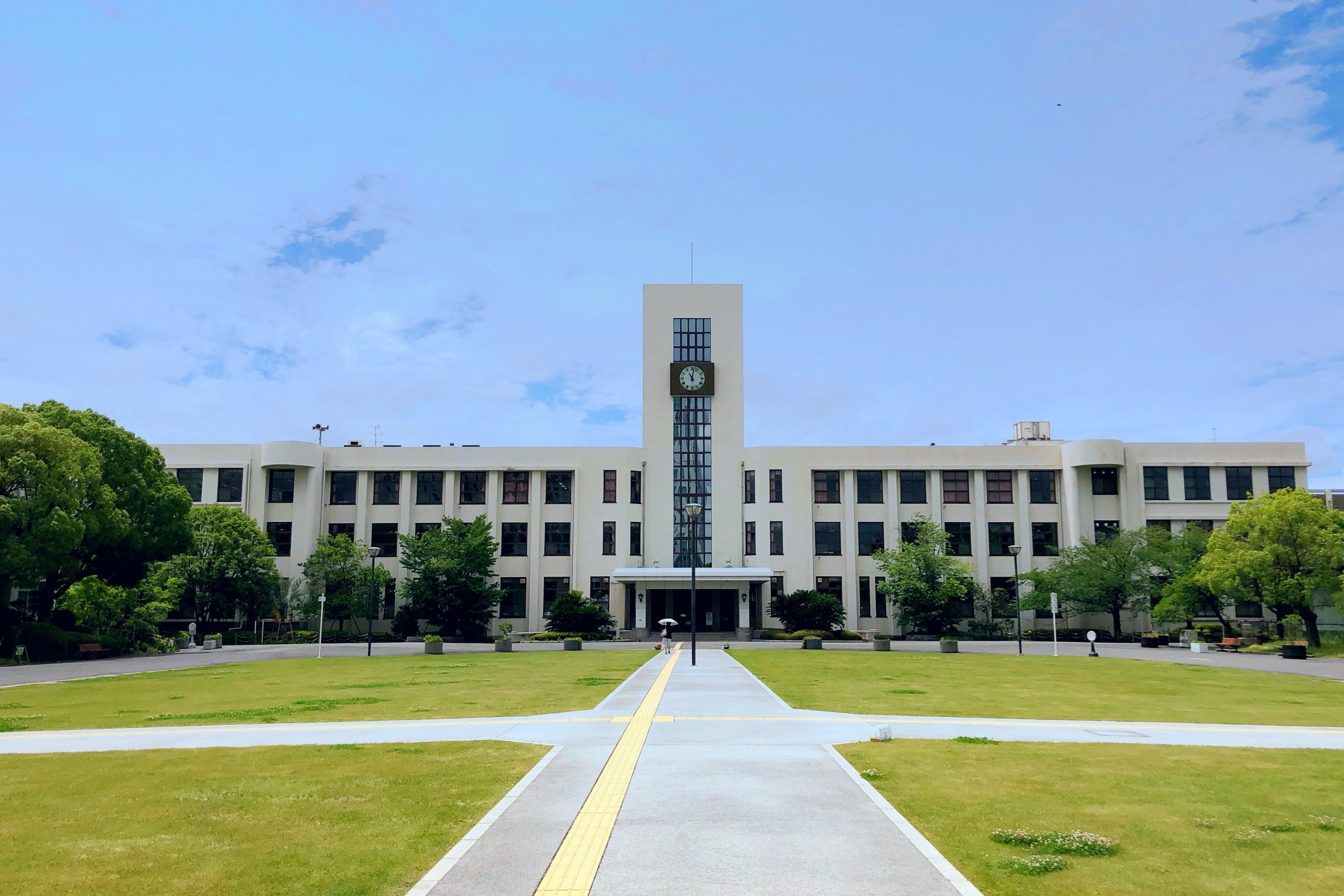
- Former names: Osaka Commercial Training Institute; Osaka City Commercial College; Osaka University of Commerce
- Motto: Creativity, Friendliness and Flexibility
- Type: Public
- Active: 1880–2022
- President: Tetsuo Arakawa
- Academic staff: 719
- Administrative staff: 1,474
- Students: 8,211
- Undergraduates: 6,590
- Postgraduates: 1,621
- Doctoral students: 534
- Other students: 1,032 (master's course); 55 (professional training)
- Location: Sumiyoshi-ku, Osaka, Japan; 34°35′33.85″N 135°30′27.14″E
- Campus: Urban
- Colors: first: agate second: sapphire sub: gray
- Website: web.archive.org/*/https://www.osaka-cu.ac.jp/en/

Osaka City University (OCU) (大阪市立大学, Ōsaka shiritsu daigaku), abbreviated to Ichidai or Shidai (市大), was a public university in Japan. It was located in Sumiyoshi-ku, Osaka. The university merged with Osaka Prefecture University to form Osaka Metropolitan University in April 2022.

== History ==
OCU's predecessor was founded in 1880, as Osaka Commercial Training Institute (大阪商業講習所) with donations by local merchants. It became Osaka Commercial School in 1885, then was municipalized in 1889. Osaka City was defeated in a bid to draw the Second National Commercial College (the winner was Kobe City), so the city authorities decided to establish a municipal commercial college without any aid from the national budget. In 1928, the college became Osaka University of Commerce (大阪商科大学), the first municipal university in Japan.

In 1901, the school was reorganized to become Osaka City Commercial College (市立大阪高等商業学校), later authorized under Specialized School Order in 1904. The college had grand brick buildings around the Taishō period.

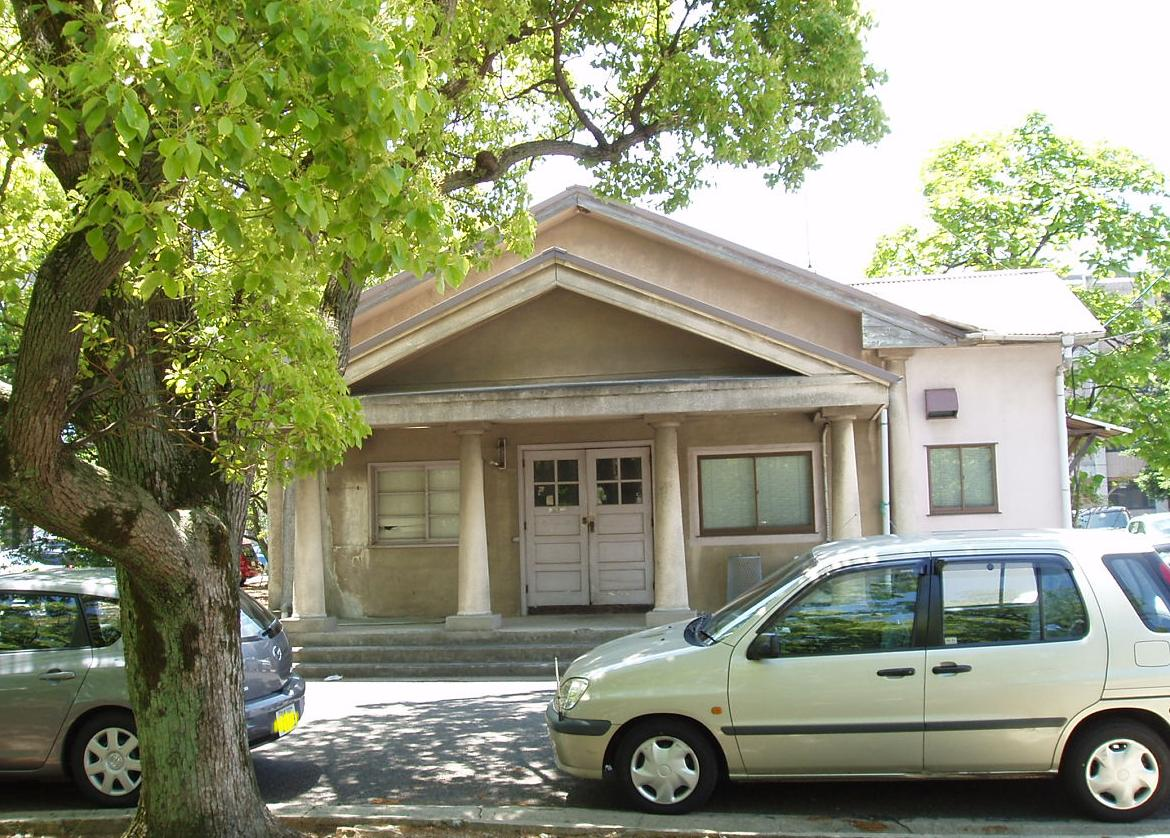
The "Chapel", one of the remains of Camp Sakai, built around 1950, removed in 2005

In 1949 OCU had five faculties (Business / Economics / Law and Literature / Science and Engineering / Home Economics).
In 1953, the Faculty of Law and Literature was divided into two faculties.
In 1955, Osaka City Medical University was incorporated and became the Faculty of Medicine.
In 1959, the Faculty of Science and Engineering was divided into two faculties.
In 1975, the Faculty of Home Economics was reorganized into the Faculty of Human Life Science.
In 2003, the Graduate School of Creative Cities was established.
In 2006, the Urban Research Plaza and the Advanced Research Institute for Natural Science and Technology were established.
Due to financial problems in many cities, all of the municipal universities in Japan were requested to incorporate. OCU became a Public University Corporation in 2006.
In 2015 OCU celebrated its 135th anniversary. In June 2020, OCU announced it would be merging with Osaka Prefecture University in a new university named University of Osaka. However, after the name was announced on June 26, 2020, Osaka University President released a statement pointing out that the English version of the new university's name was "remarkably similar" to that of Osaka University, adding, "It will cause confusion among our students, and work as a great obstacle for the future of both universities, which are reaching out to the world." The English name ultimately chosen was Osaka Metropolitan University.

== Organization ==
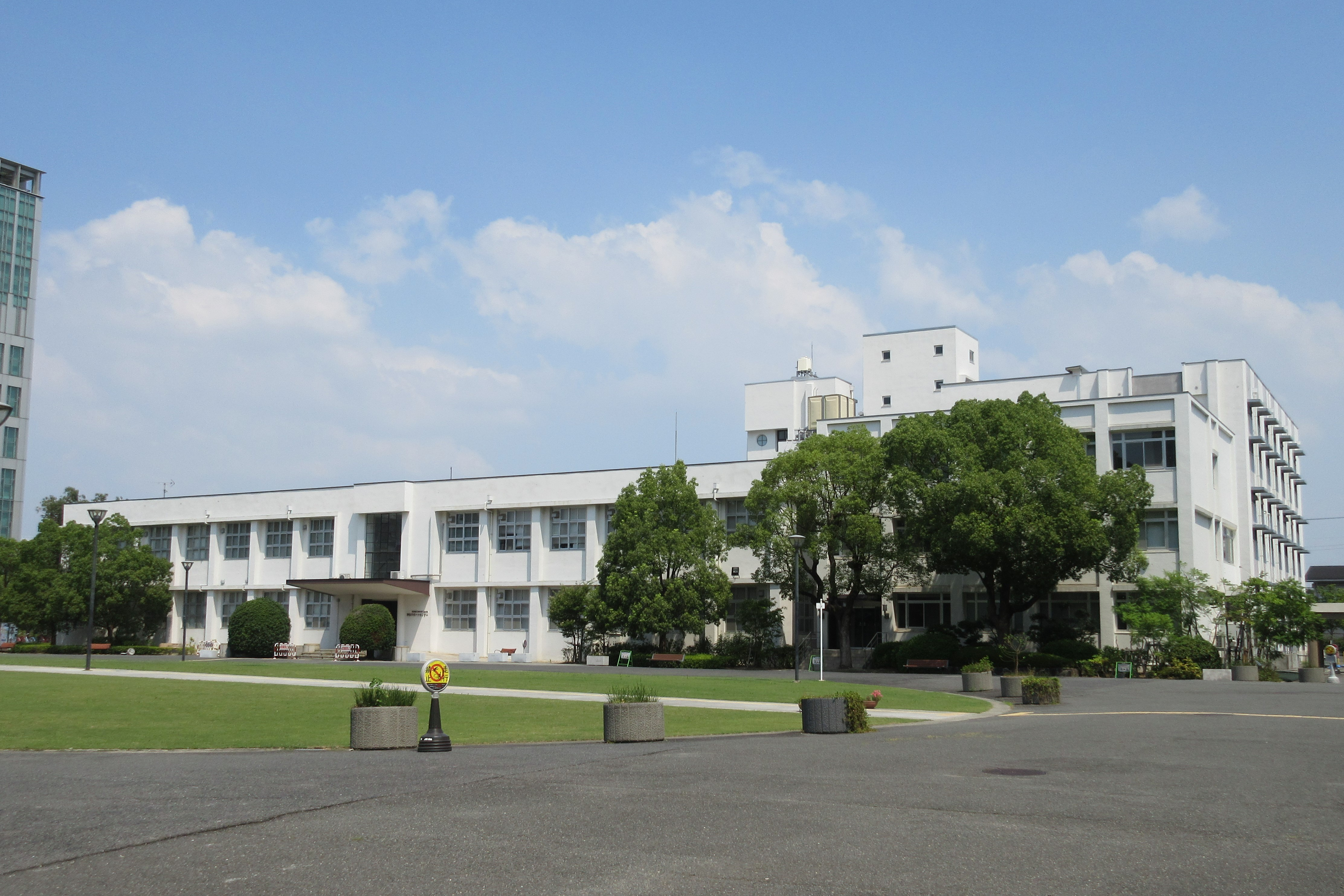
Student Support Center

=== Undergraduate schools ===
- Faculty of Business
- Faculty of Economics
- Faculty of Law
- Faculty of Literature and Human Sciences
- Faculty of Science
- Faculty of Engineering
- Faculty of Medicine
- School of Nursing
- Faculty of Human Life Science

=== Graduate schools ===
- Graduate School of Business
- Graduate School of Economics
- Graduate School of Law
- Graduate School of Literature and Human Sciences
- Graduate School of Science
- Graduate School of Engineering
- Graduate School of Medicine
- Graduate School of Nursing
- Graduate School of Human Life Science
- Graduate School of Urban Management
- Graduate School of Creative Cities

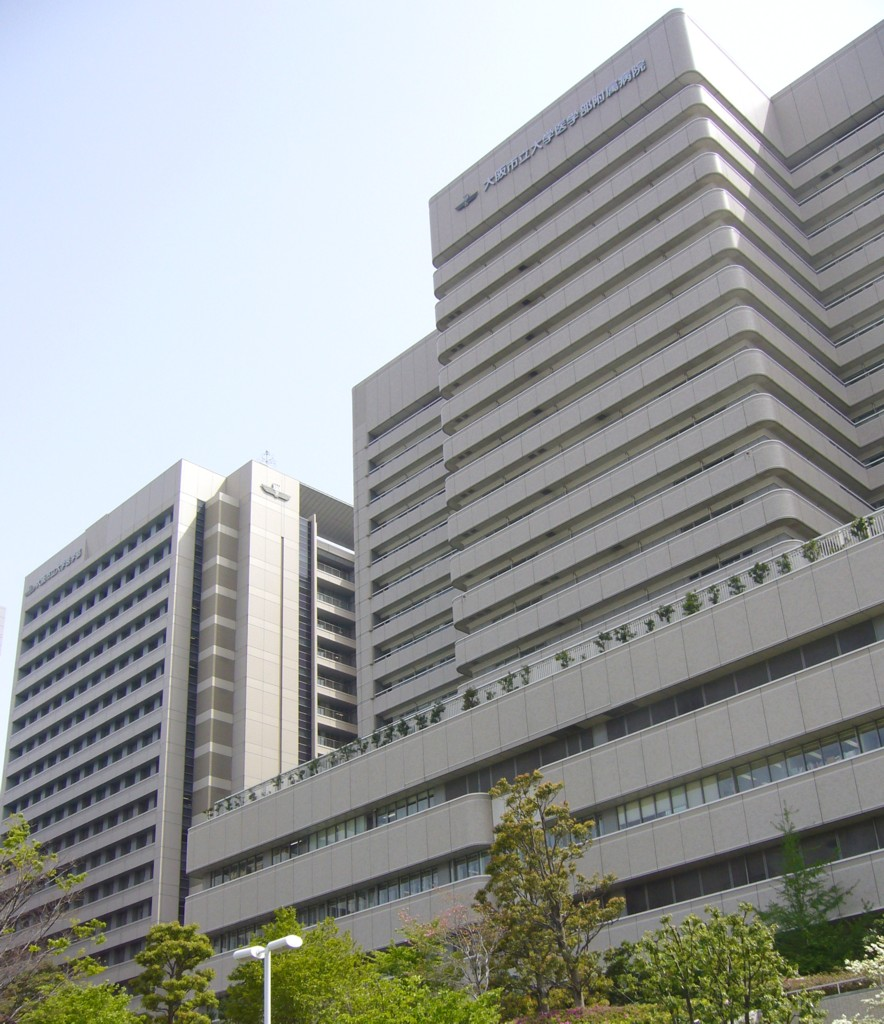
University Hospital and Faculty of Medicine

=== Institutes ===
- Media Center and Library
- Center of Education and Research for Disaster Management (CERD)
- Research Center for Artificial Photosynthesis (ReCAP)
- URA Center and Osaka City University Incubator
- Center for Health Science Innovation (CHSI)
- University Hospital
- Research Center for Urban Health and Sports
- Research Center for Human Rights
- Urban Research Plaza
- Center for Research and Development of Higher Education
- Research Center for Finance & Securities
- English Education Development Center
- Advanced Research Institute for Natural Science and Technology
- Botanical Gardens Faculty of Science Osaka City University; located in Katano)
- Toneyama Institute for Tuberculosis Research (a part of Medical School; located in Toyonaka)

== Evaluation from Business World ==
The university ranking of the ratio of "president and chief executive officer of listed company"
	Ranking
all universities in Japan	26th out of all the 744 universities which existed as of 2006
Source	2006 Survey by Weekly Diamond 〈ja〉 on the ranking of the universities which produced the high ratio of the graduates who hold the position of "president and chief executive officer of listed company" to all the graduates of each university

The university ranking according to the ratio of the number of the officers & managers produced by each university to the number of graduates
	Ranking
all universities in Japan	3rd out of all the 778 universities which existed as of 2010
Source	2010 Survey by Weekly Economist 〈ja〉 on the ranking of universities according to the numerousness of the number of the officers & managers produced by each university in consideration of the number of graduates

The university ranking according to the order of the evaluation by Personnel Departments of Leading Companies in Japan
	Ranking
Japan	16th (out of 781 universities in Japan as of 2020)
Source	2020 Nikkei Survey to all listed (3,714) and leading unlisted (1,100), totally 4,814 companies

== Notable alumni ==
- Masao Abe, professor in religious studies
- Yoshi Amao, actor
- Hideo Hashimoto, soccer player
- Takafumi Isomura, former mayor of Osaka City
- Takeshi Kaikō, writer
- Otogo Kataoka, former president of Nomura Securities
- Takamaro Tamiya, a hijacker of Japan Airlines Flight 351
- Minoru Segawa, former president of Nomura Securities
- Shinya Yamanaka, Nobel Laureate in Physiology or Medicine 2012, the scientist who discovered the Induced Pluripotent Stem Cell
- Eiichi Yamashita, politician
