= Osaka Metropolitan University =

Higher education institution in Osaka Prefecture, Japan

- 大阪公立大学
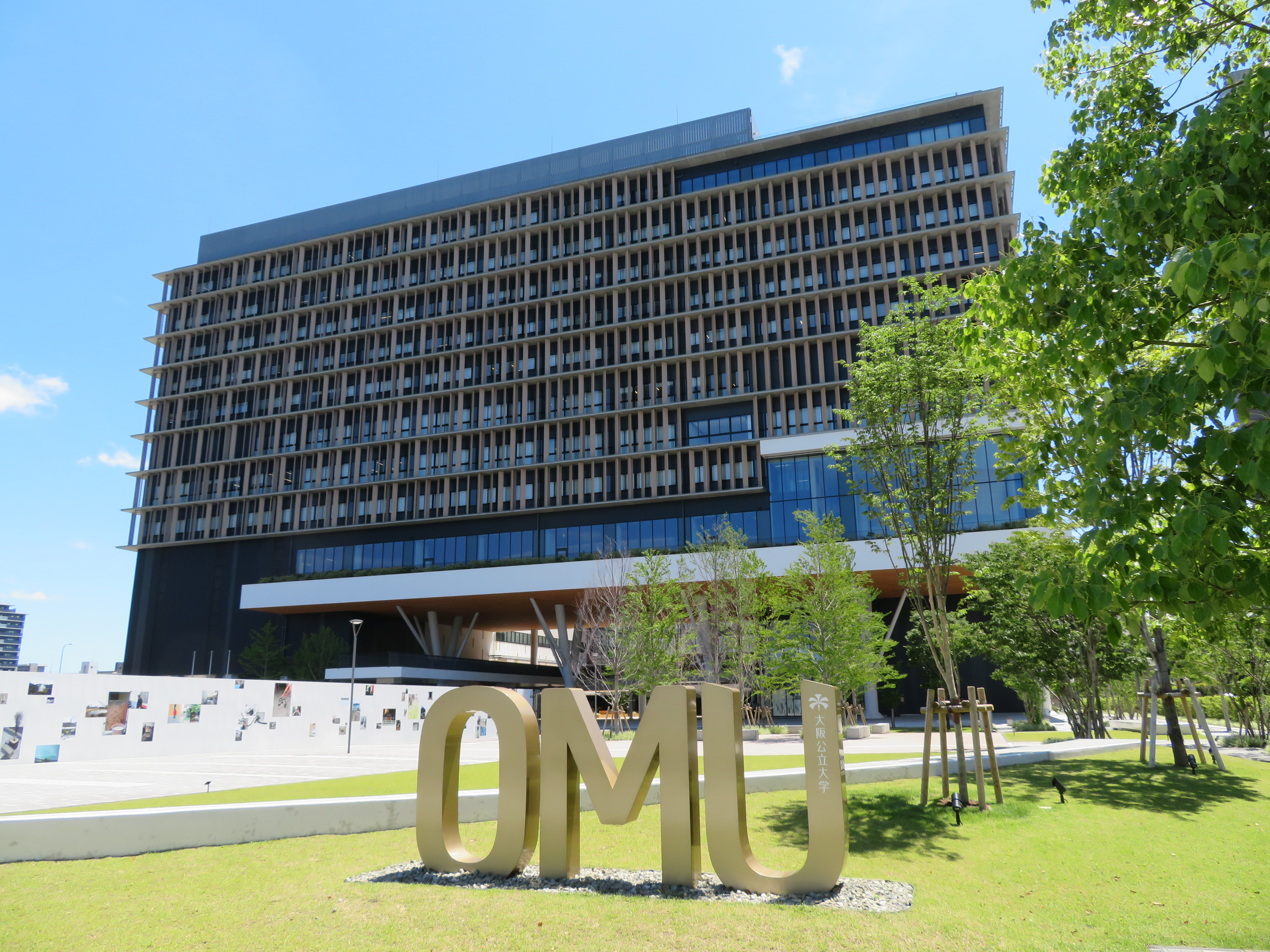
- Morinomiya Main Campus
- Former names: Osaka City University (OCU); Osaka Prefecture University (OPU)
- Type: Public
- Established: 1880 (formerly OCU); 1883 (formerly OPU); Merged April 1, 2022; 4 years ago
- Location: Abeno-ku, Osaka, Japan
- Campus: Urban
- Website: www.omu.ac.jp/en/

Osaka Metropolitan University (大阪公立大学, Ōsaka kōritsu daigaku; lit. 'Osaka Public University'; abbreviated to OMU) is a Japanese public university that was established through the integration of Osaka City University (OCU) and Osaka Prefecture University (OPU) on 1 April 2022.

OMU was inaugurated with 1 undergraduate college, 11 undergraduate schools and 15 graduate schools. With the integration of the two universities, the number of students amounts to about 16,000, which is the largest scale in Japan as a public university. In addition, OMU's number of new first-year students per year is 2,853, placing it in third place among Japanese national/public universities, after Osaka University and the University of Tokyo.

University rankings

Global – Overall
- QS World: 901-950 (2026)

== Campus ==
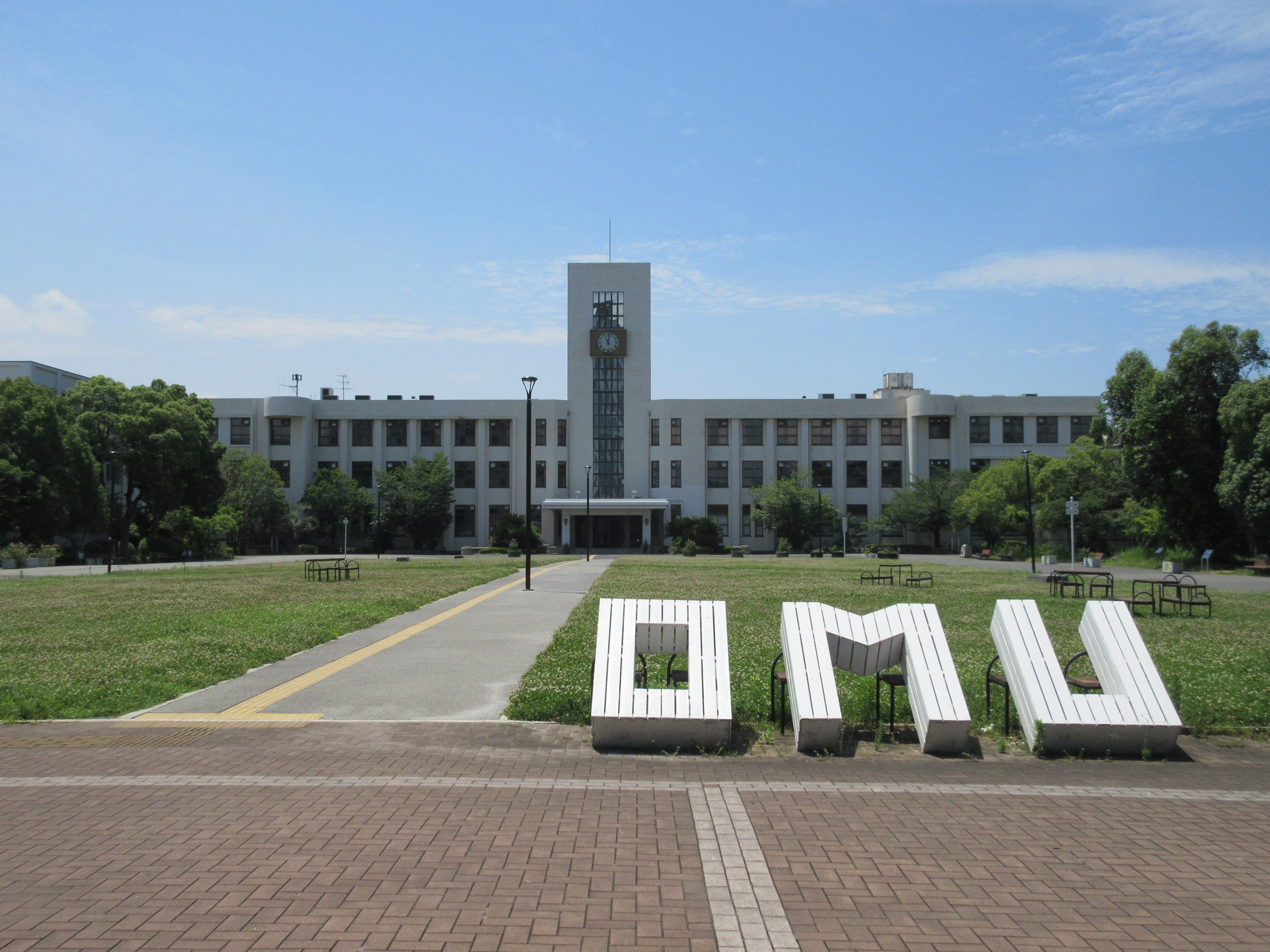
OMU Sugimoto Campus (former OCU Headquarters)

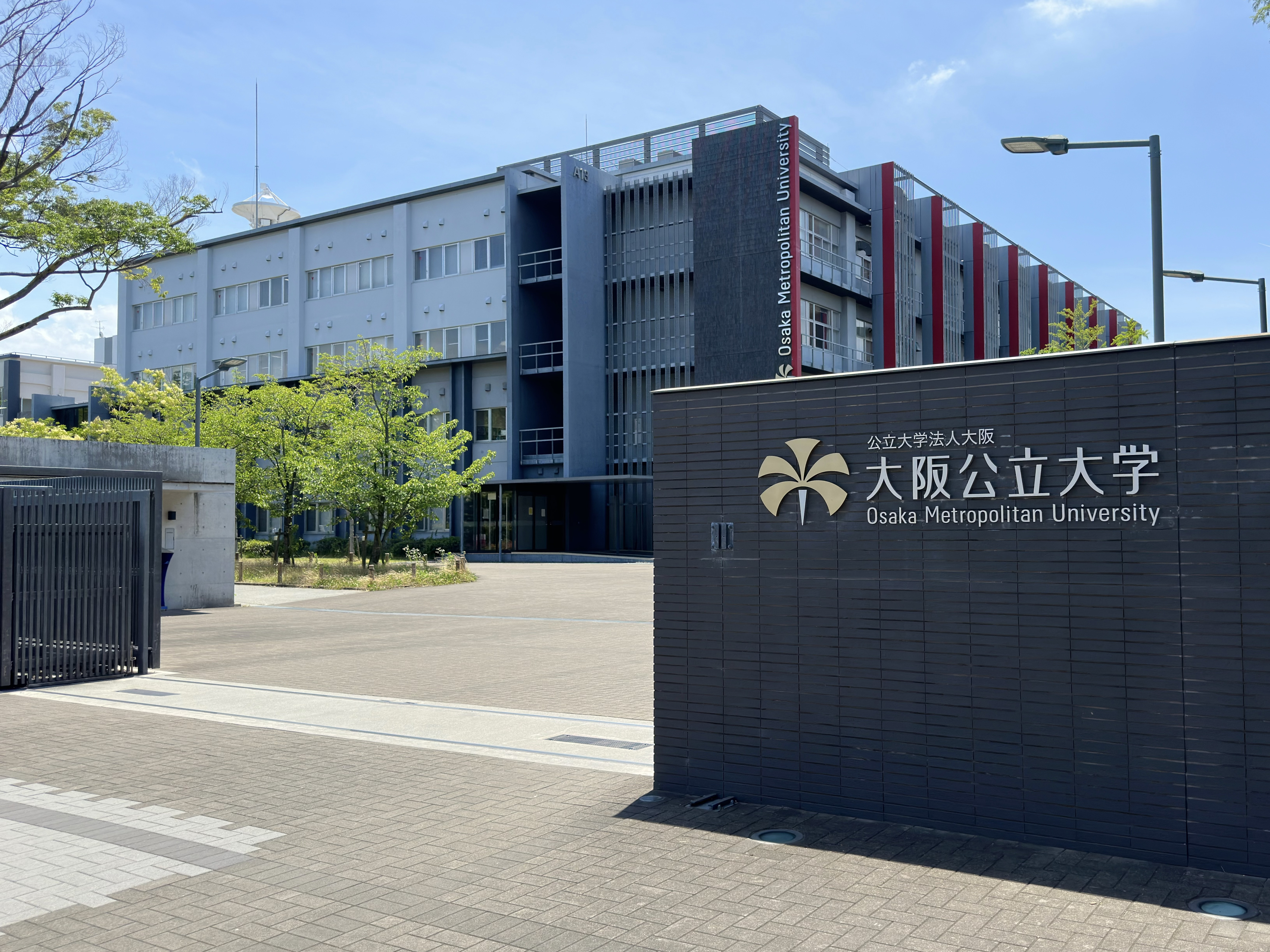
OMU Nakamozu Campus (former OPU Headquarters)

Osaka Metropolitan University has 6 campuses in Osaka.

† = from former OPU ‡ = from former OCU

- Morinomiya Main Campus
- Nakamozu Campus†
- Rinku Campus†
- Sugimoto Campus‡
- Abeno Campus‡
- Umeda Satellite‡

There is also one former campus:

- Habikino Campus† (closed 2025; functions moved to Abeno Campus (nursing) and Morinomiya Campus (Rehabilitation))

== Schools and divisions ==
=== Undergraduate Schools ===
- College of Sustainable System Sciences (現代システム科学域)
- School of Literature and Human Sciences (文学部)
- School of Law (法学部)
- School of Economics (経済学部)
- School of Business (商学部)
- School of Science (理学部)
- School of Engineering (工学部)
- School of Agriculture (農学部)
- School of Veterinary Science (獣医学部)
- School of Medicine (医学部)
- School of Nursing (看護学部)
- School of Human Life and Ecology (生活科学部)

=== Graduate Schools ===
- Graduate School of Sustainable System Sciences (現代システム科学研究科)
- Graduate School of Literature and Human Sciences (文学研究科)
- Graduate School of Law (法学研究科)
- Graduate School of Economics (経済学研究科)
- Graduate School of Business (経営学研究科)
- Graduate School of Science (理学研究科）
- Graduate School of Engineering （工学研究科)
- Graduate School of Agriculture (農学研究科)
- Graduate School of Veterinary Science (獣医学研究科)
- Graduate School of Medicine (医学研究科)
- Graduate School of Rehabilitation Science (リハビリテーション学研究科)
- Graduate School of Nursing (看護学研究科)
- Graduate School of Human Life and Ecology (生活科学研究科)
- Graduate School of Urban Management (都市経営研究科)
- Graduate School of Informatics (情報学研究科)

=== Other Institutions ===
- Osaka Metropolitan University Hospital
- Botanical Gardens School of Science Osaka Metropolitan University

== Notable people ==
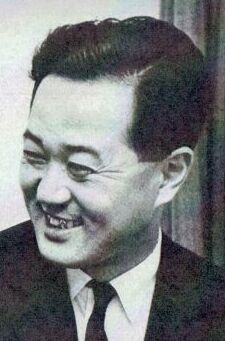
Kazuhiko Nishijima (西島 和彦), physicist, professor at OCU, 1960-61 Nobel Prize in Physics nominee

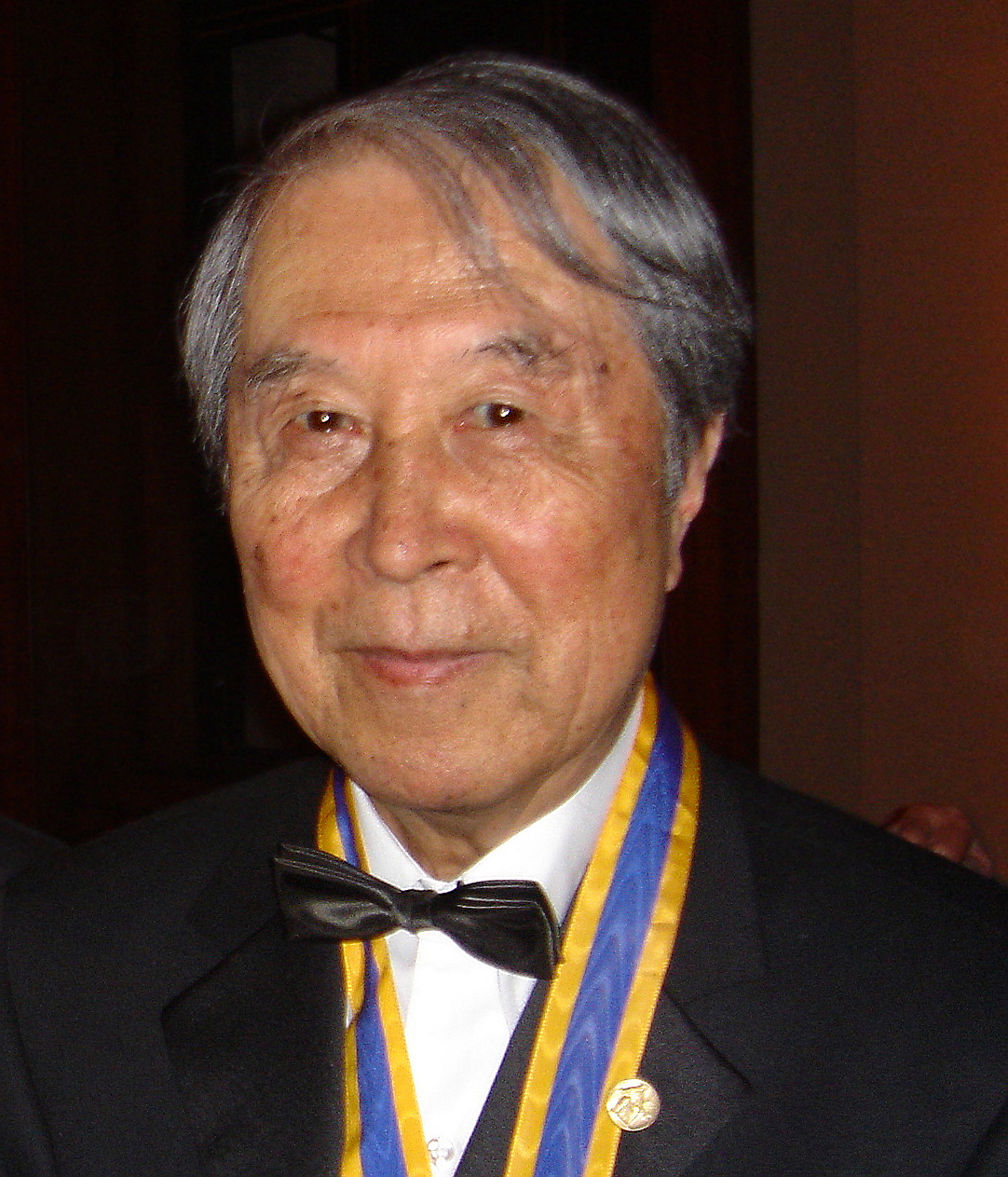
Yoichiro Nambu (南部 陽一郎), physicist, professor at OCU & OMU, 2008 Nobel Prize in Physics winner

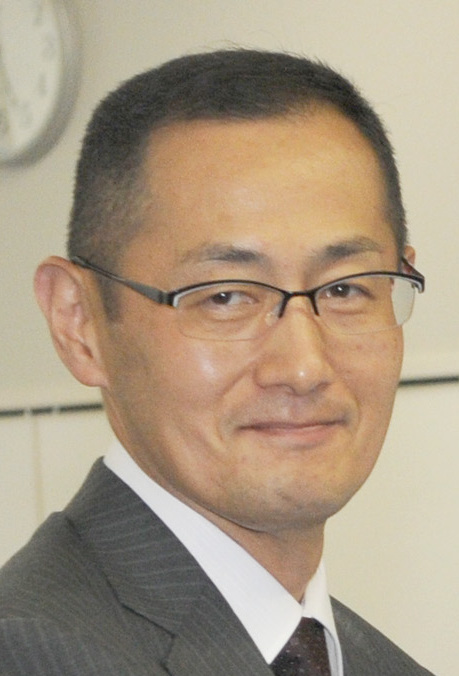
Shinya Yamanaka (山中 伸弥), stem cell researcher, receive a PhD from OCU, 2012 Nobel Prize for Physiology or Medicine winner

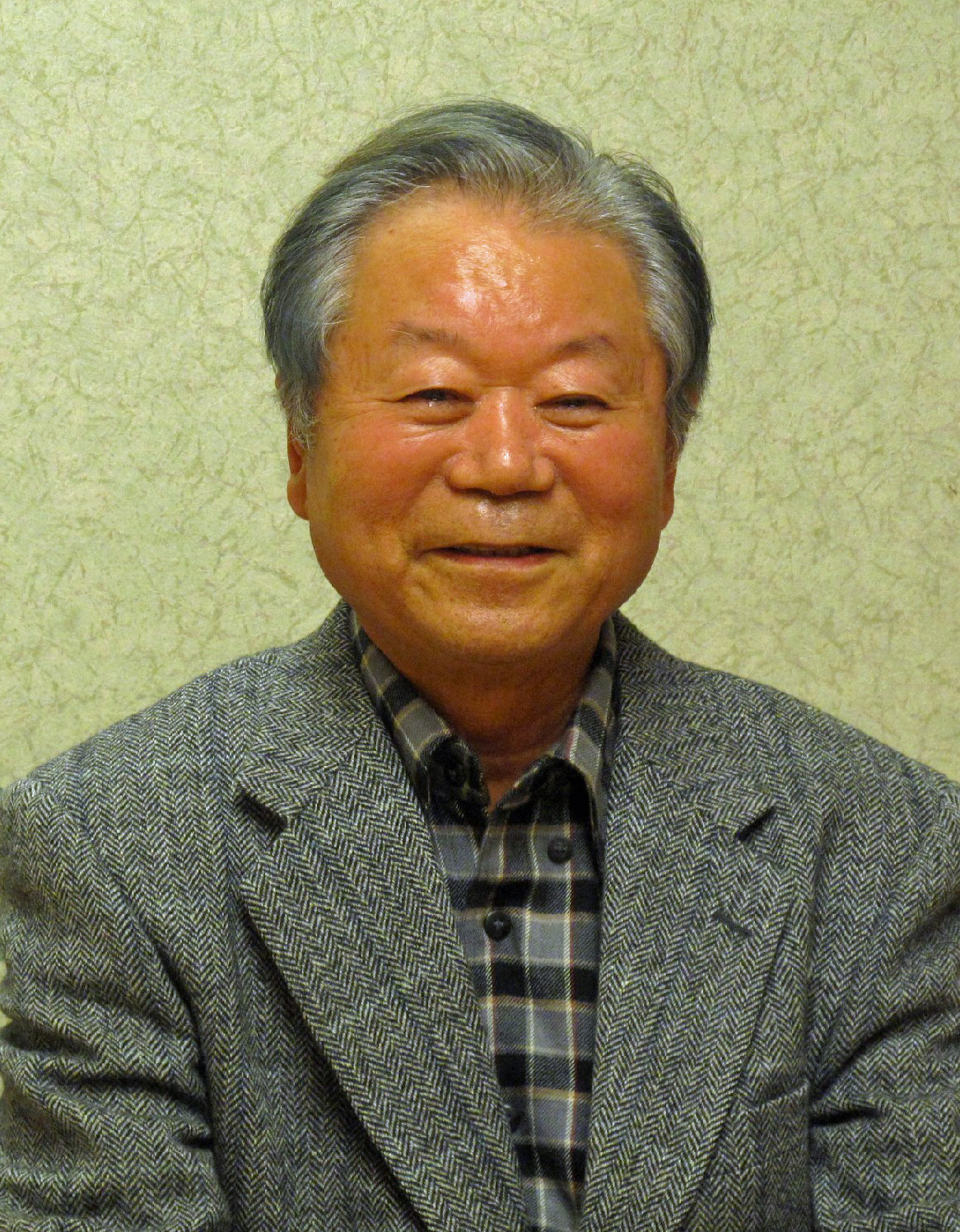
Kenkichi Sonogashira (薗頭 健吉), chemist, professor at OCU, who discovered the Sonogashira coupling

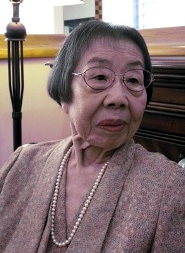
Kōno Taeko (河野 多惠子), OPU alumna, writer

== See also ==
- Tokyo Metropolitan University
