= Osaka Metropolitan University Hospital =

Hospital in Osaka, Japan

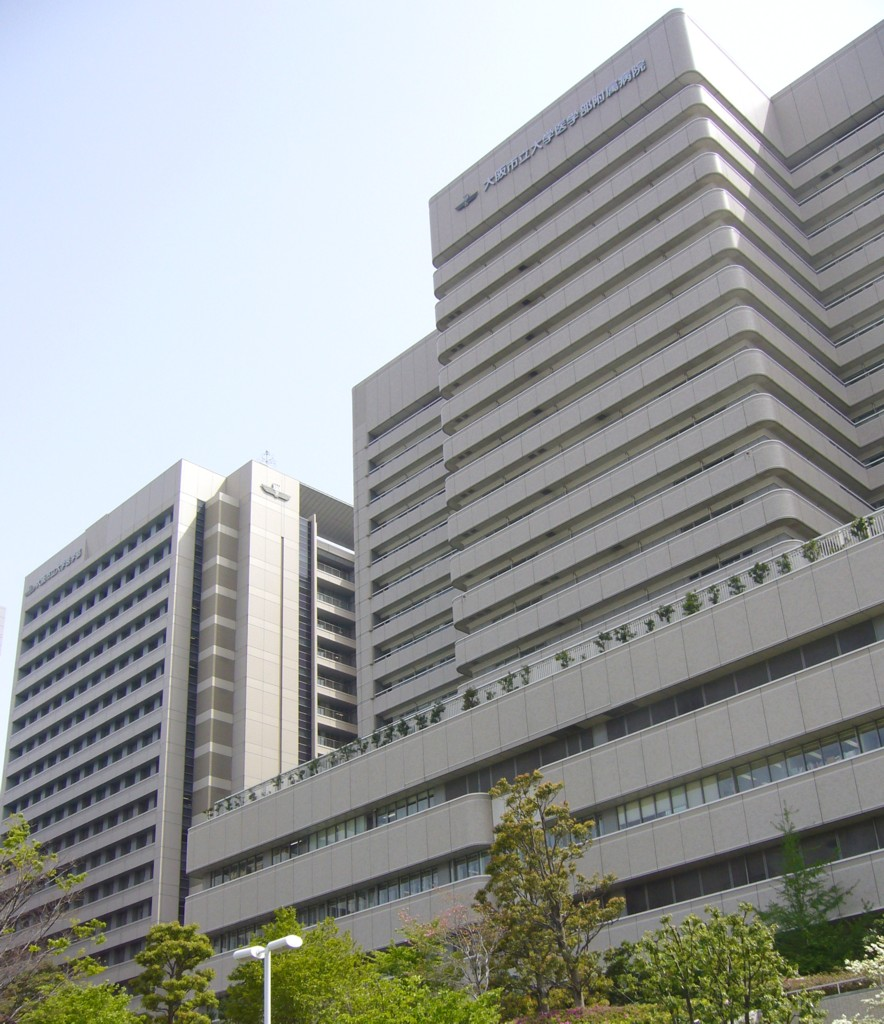

Geography
- Location: Abeno-ku, Osaka, Japan
- Coordinates: 34.646633°N 135.508822°E

Organisation
- Type: Teaching
- Affiliated university: Osaka Metropolitan University

Services
- Beds: 980

History
- Founded: 1925

Links
- Website: www.hosp.med.osaka-cu.ac.jp/eng/index.shtml
- Lists: Hospitals in Japan

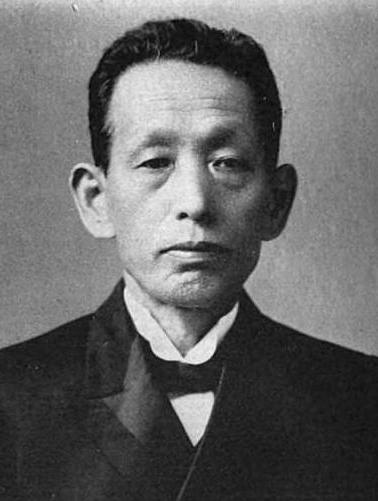
Kichiemon Kishimoto

Osaka Metropolitan University Hospital (大阪公立大学医学部附属病院, Ōsaka kouritsu daigaku igakubu fuzoku byōin) is a university hospital in Japan. It's located in Abeno-ku, Osaka, and affiliated with Osaka Metropolitan University.

== History ==
The hospital's predecessor was founded in 1925, as the municipal hospital for the city of Osaka, located in Abeno-ku, Osaka due to donation from Kichiemon Kichimoto. Its name was changed as the south municipal hospital for the city of Osaka:.

In 1944, Osaka Municipal Medical school was founded and the hospital was affiliated with the school.

In 1948, Osaka Medical College was founded and the hospital was affiliated with the college.

In 1955, the college was united to Osaka City University, and it affiliated with the university.

In 1993, a new hospital building was completed.

In 2022, the hospital name was changed from "Osaka City University Hospital" to "Osaka Metropolitan University Hospital".

== Medical Department ==
Osaka City University Hospital has 32 medical departments including:

- General Medical Center
- Cardiovascular Medicine
- Respiratory Medicine
- Clinical Immunology and Rheumatology
- Diabetes Center
- Nephrology
- Endocrinology
- Gastroenterology
- Internal Medicine; Hepato-Biliary-Pancreatic Diseases
- Hematology and Hematopoietic Cell Transplantation
- Neurology
- Department of Infectious Diseases
- Orthopedic Surgery
- Gastroenterological Surgery
- Breast and Endocrine Surgery
- Department of Hepato-Biliary-Pancreatic Surgery
- Cardiovascular Surgery
- Thoracic Surgery
- Pediatric Surgery
- Neurosurgery
- Plastic & Reconstructive Surgery
- Pediatrics & Neonatology
- Neuropsychiatry
- Urology (Kidney Transplantation)
- Obstetrics & Gynecology, Women's Lifecare Medicine
- Nuclear medicine
- Anesthesiology and Pain Clinic
- Dermatology
- Diagnostic and Interventional Radiology
- Radiation Oncology
- Ophthalmology
- Otolaryngology, Head and Neck Surgery
- Oral and Maxillofacial Surgery
- Rehabilitation Medicine
- Department of Pathology
- Clinical Laboratory
- Department of Clinical Genomics

== MedCity21 ==
MedCity21 is a branch clinic located on the 21st floor of Abeno Harukas. This clinic was opened in 2014 as the first clinic operated by public university in Japan. It provides physical examination, general medicine, and medical check for pregnant women, and also collects medical data with patients' consent.

== Access ==
According to a travel site, access to Osaka City University Hospital is below

- 5 minutes walk from Tennōji Station
- 7 minutes walk from Tennōji Ekimae Station
- 9 minutes walk from Dōbutsuen-mae Station

== See also ==
- Osaka Metropolitan University
