= Symplectic vector field =

In physics and mathematics, a symplectic vector field is one whose flow preserves a symplectic form. That is, if $(M,\omega)$ is a symplectic manifold with smooth manifold $M$ and symplectic form $\omega$, then a vector field $X\in\mathfrak{X}(M)$ in the Lie algebra $\mathfrak{X}(M)$ of smooth vector fields on $M$ is symplectic if its flow preserves the symplectic structure. In other words, the Lie derivative of the vector field must vanish:

$\mathcal{L}_X\omega=0$.

An alternative definition is that a vector field is symplectic if its interior product with the symplectic form is closed. (The interior product gives a map from vector fields to 1-forms, which is an isomorphism due to the nondegeneracy of a symplectic 2-form.) The equivalence of the definitions follows from the closedness of the symplectic form and Cartan's magic formula for the Lie derivative in terms of the exterior derivative.

If the interior product of a vector field with the symplectic form is an exact form (and in particular, a closed form), then it is called a Hamiltonian vector field. If the first De Rham cohomology group $H^1(M)$ of the manifold is trivial, all closed forms are exact, so all symplectic vector fields are Hamiltonian. That is, the obstruction to a symplectic vector field being Hamiltonian lives in $H^1(M)$. In particular, symplectic vector fields on simply connected manifolds are Hamiltonian.

The Lie bracket of two symplectic vector fields is Hamiltonian, and thus the collection of symplectic vector fields and the collection of Hamiltonian vector fields both form Lie algebras.
