= Hamiltonian vector field =

Vector field defined for any energy function

In mathematics and physics, a Hamiltonian vector field on a symplectic manifold is a vector field defined for any energy function or Hamiltonian. Named after the physicist and mathematician Sir William Rowan Hamilton, a Hamiltonian vector field is a geometric manifestation of Hamilton's equations in classical mechanics. The integral curves of a Hamiltonian vector field represent solutions to the equations of motion in the Hamiltonian form. The diffeomorphisms of a symplectic manifold arising from the flow of a Hamiltonian vector field are known as canonical transformations in physics and (Hamiltonian) symplectomorphisms in mathematics.

Hamiltonian vector fields can be defined more generally on an arbitrary Poisson manifold. The Lie bracket of two Hamiltonian vector fields corresponding to functions $f$ and $g$ on the manifold is itself a Hamiltonian vector field, with the Hamiltonian given by the Poisson bracket of $f$ and $g$.

== Definition ==
Suppose that $(M,\omega)$ is a symplectic manifold. Since the symplectic form $\omega$ is nondegenerate, it sets up a fiberwise-linear isomorphism

$$\omega: TM \to T^*M,$$

between the tangent bundle $TM$ and the cotangent bundle $T^*M$, with the inverse

$$\Omega: T^* M \to T M, \quad \Omega = \omega^{-1}.$$

Therefore, one-forms on a symplectic manifold $M$ may be identified with vector fields and every differentiable function $H:M\rightarrow\mathbb{R}$ determines a unique vector field $X_H$, called the Hamiltonian vector field with the Hamiltonian $H$, by defining for every vector field $Y$ on $M$,

$$\mathrm{d}H(Y) = \omega(X_H,Y).$$
Or more succinctly, $\iota_{X_H} \omega = dH$.

Note: Some authors define the Hamiltonian vector field with the opposite sign. One has to be mindful of varying conventions in physical and mathematical literature.

== Examples ==
Suppose that $M$ is a $2n$-dimensional symplectic manifold. Then locally, one may choose canonical coordinates $(q^1,\cdots,q^n,p_1,\cdots,p_n)$ on $M$, in which the symplectic form is expressed as: $\omega = \sum_i \mathrm{d}q^i \wedge \mathrm{d}p_i,$

where $\operatorname{d}$ denotes the exterior derivative and $\wedge$ denotes the exterior product. Then the Hamiltonian vector field with Hamiltonian $H$ takes the form: $\Chi_H = \left( \frac{\partial H}{\partial p_i}, - \frac{\partial H}{\partial q^i} \right) = \Omega\,\mathrm{d}H,$

where $\Omega$ is a $2n\times 2n$ square matrix

$$\Omega =
\begin{bmatrix}
0 & I_n \\
-I_n & 0 \\
\end{bmatrix},$$

and

$$\mathrm{d}H = \begin{bmatrix}
\frac{\partial H}{\partial q^i} \\
\frac{\partial H}{\partial p_i}
\end{bmatrix}.$$

The matrix $\Omega$ is frequently denoted with $\mathbf{J}$.

Suppose that $M=\mathbb{R}^{2n}$ is the $2n$-dimensional symplectic vector space with (global) canonical coordinates.

- If $H = p_i$ then $X_H = \partial/\partial q^i;$
- if $H = q_i$ then $X_H = -\partial/\partial p^i;$
- if $H = \frac{1}{2} \sum (p_i)^2$ then $X_H = \sum p_i\partial/\partial q^i;$
- if $H = \frac{1}{2} \sum a_{ij} q^i q^j, a_{ij} = a_{ji}$ then $X_H = -\sum a_{ij} q_i\partial/\partial p^j.$

== Properties ==
- The assignment $f\mapsto X_f$ is linear, so that the sum of two Hamiltonian functions transforms into the sum of the corresponding Hamiltonian vector fields.
- Suppose that $(q^1,\cdots,q^n,p_1,\cdots,p_n)$ are canonical coordinates on $M$ (see above). Then a curve $\gamma(t)=(q(t),p(t))$ is an integral curve of the Hamiltonian vector field $X_H$ if and only if it is a solution of Hamilton's equations:
  $$\begin{align}
\dot{q}^i & = \frac{\partial H}{\partial p_i} \\
\dot{p}_i & =-\frac{\partial H}{\partial q^i}.
\end{align}$$
- The Hamiltonian $H$ is constant along the integral curves, because $\langle dH, \dot{\gamma}\rangle = \omega(X_H(\gamma),X_H(\gamma)) = 0$. That is, $H(\gamma(t))$ is actually independent of $t$. This property corresponds to the conservation of energy in Hamiltonian mechanics.
- More generally, if two functions $F$ and $H$ have a zero Poisson bracket (cf. below), then $F$ is constant along the integral curves of $H$, and similarly, $H$ is constant along the integral curves of $F$. This fact is the abstract mathematical principle behind Noether's theorem. (Note: See for a very concise statement and proof of Noether's theorem.)
- The symplectic form $\omega$ is preserved by the Hamiltonian flow. Equivalently, the Lie derivative $\mathcal{L}_{X_H} \omega=0$.

== Poisson bracket ==
The notion of a Hamiltonian vector field leads to a skew-symmetric bilinear operation on the differentiable functions on a symplectic manifold $M$ – the Poisson bracket – defined by the formula

$$\{f,g\} = \omega(X_g, X_f)= dg(X_f) = \mathcal{L}_{X_f} g$$

where $\mathcal{L}_X$ denotes the Lie derivative along a vector field $X$. Moreover, one can check that the following identity holds: $X_{\{f,g\}}= -[X_f,X_g]$,

where the right hand side represents the Lie bracket of the Hamiltonian vector fields with Hamiltonians $f$ and $g$. As a consequence (a proof at Poisson bracket), the Poisson bracket satisfies the Jacobi identity: $\{\{f,g\},h\} + \{\{g,h\},f\} + \{\{h,f\},g\}=0$,

which means that the vector space of differentiable functions on $M$, endowed with the Poisson bracket, has the structure of a Lie algebra over $\mathbb{R}$, and the assignment $f\mapsto X_f$ is a Lie algebra homomorphism, whose kernel consists of the locally constant functions (constant functions if $M$ is connected).

== Works cited ==
- Abraham, Ralph; Marsden, Jerrold E. (1978). Foundations of Mechanics. London: Benjamin-Cummings. ISBN 978-080530102-1.See section 3.2.
- Arnol'd, V.I. (1997). Mathematical Methods of Classical Mechanics. Berlin etc: Springer. ISBN 0-387-96890-3.
- Frankel, Theodore (1997). The Geometry of Physics. Cambridge University Press. ISBN 0-521-38753-1.
- Lee, J. M. (2003), Introduction to Smooth manifolds, Springer Graduate Texts in Mathematics, vol. 218, ISBN 0-387-95448-1
- McDuff, Dusa; Salamon, D. (1998). Introduction to Symplectic Topology. Oxford Mathematical Monographs. ISBN 0-19-850451-9.
