= Hamilton =

Hamilton may refer to:

- Alexander Hamilton (1755/1757–1804), one of the Founding Fathers of the United States
- Hamilton (musical), a 2015 Broadway musical by Lin-Manuel Miranda
  - Hamilton (2020 film), a live film recording of the 2015 musical
- Hamilton, Canada
- Hamilton, New Zealand

Hamilton may also refer to:

== People ==
- Hamilton (name), a common British surname and occasional given name, usually of Scottish origin, including a list of persons with the surname
  - The Duke of Hamilton, the premier peer of Scotland
  - Lord Hamilton (disambiguation), several Scottish, Irish and British peers, and some members of the judiciary, who may be referred to simply as Hamilton
  - Clan Hamilton, an ancient Scottish kindred
- Hamílton (footballer, born 1980), Togolese footballer

== Places ==
=== Australia ===
==== Queensland ====
- Hamilton, Queensland, suburb of Brisbane
  - Hamilton Reach, a reach of the Brisbane River
  - Electoral district of Hamilton (Queensland)
  - Town of Hamilton, a former local government area
  - Hamilton Town Hall, Brisbane, a heritage-listed former town hall
- Hamilton Island (Queensland)

==== Other places in Australia ====
- Hamilton, New South Wales, suburb of Newcastle
- Hamilton Hill, Western Australia, suburb of Perth
- Hamilton, South Australia
- Hamilton, Tasmania
- Hamilton, Victoria

=== Canada ===
- Hamilton, Ontario
  - Hamilton Harbour, formerly known as Burlington Bay, a branch of Lake Ontario
  - Hamilton (Province of Canada electoral district), a former electoral district before the establishment of Canada and the Province of Ontario
  - Hamilton (provincial electoral district), a former electoral riding
  - Hamilton (federal electoral district), a former federal electoral district
- Hamilton, Ontario (township) (unrelated township)
- Hamilton Island (Nunavut)

=== New Zealand ===
- Hamilton (New Zealand electorate), a former parliamentary electorate

=== United Kingdom ===
- Hamilton, South Lanarkshire, Scotland (formerly Cadzow, renamed in 15th century)
  - Hamilton Mausoleum, which holds the records for the world's longest echo, in Hamilton, South Lanarkshire
  - Hamilton Palace, built 1695, demolished 1927, near Hamilton, South Lanarkshire
  - Hamilton (Scottish district), former local government district southeast of Glasgow
  - Hamilton (UK Parliament constituency), a former burgh constituency
- Hamilton, Leicestershire, England

=== United States ===
- Hamilton, Alabama
- Hamilton, California, in Butte County
- Hamilton Field, a former US Air Force base in California
- Hamilton City, California, in Glenn County
- Hamilton Dome, a mountain in California
- Hamilton, Colorado
- Hamilton, Georgia
- Hamilton, Illinois
- Hamilton, Indiana, in Steuben and DeKalb counties
- Hamilton, Clinton County, Indiana
- Hamilton, Madison County, Indiana
- Hamilton, St. Joseph County, Indiana
- Hamilton, Iowa
- Hamilton, Kansas
- Hamilton, Kentucky
- Hamilton Hills, Baltimore, Maryland, a neighborhood in Baltimore
- Hamilton, Massachusetts
- Hamilton, Michigan
- Hamilton, Minnesota
- Hamilton, Mississippi
- Hamilton, Missouri
- Hamilton, Montana
- Hamilton, Nevada
- Hamilton Township, Atlantic County, New Jersey
- Hamilton Township, Mercer County, New Jersey
  - Hamilton Square, New Jersey, a census-designated place within the township
- Hamilton, Monmouth County, New Jersey
- Hamilton (town), New York
  - Hamilton (village), New York
- Hamilton, North Carolina
- Hamilton, North Dakota
- Hamilton, Ohio
- Hamilton, Pennsylvania
- Hamilton Street, in Allentown, Pennsylvania
- Hamilton, Texas
- Hamilton, Virginia, in Loudoun County
- Hamilton, Cumberland County, Virginia
- Hamilton, Washington
- Hamilton, West Virginia
- Hamilton, Wisconsin
- Hamilton, Fond du Lac County, Wisconsin, an unincorporated community
- Hamilton, Ozaukee County, Wisconsin, an unincorporated community

=== Other places ===
- Hamilton, Bermuda, that territory's capital
  - Hamilton Parish, Bermuda
- Port Hamilton, a small group of islands in the Jeju Strait off the southern coast of the Korean Peninsula
- Hamilton railway station (disambiguation), stations of the name
- Hamilton (crater), a lunar impact crater

== Arts and entertainment ==
- Hamilton (play), 1917, by Mary Hamlin
- Hamilton (1998 film), a Swedish-produced film based on the character Carl Hamilton
- Hamilton (2006 film), 2006 American film
- Hamilton: In the Interest of the Nation, 2012 Swedish film
- Hamilton (album), based on the 2015 musical
- The Hamilton Mixtape, album of music from the 2015 musical
- Hamilton Records, a record label
- Hamilton (Saturday Night Live)

== Businesses ==
- Hamish Hamilton Limited, a British book-publishing house
- Hamilton Standard, a supply company for aircraft propeller parts
- Hamilton Watch Company, a Swiss watchmaker belonging to the Swatch Group
- Hamilton (automobile company), a short-lived automaker in Michigan in the 1910s
- Hamilton's Ewell Vineyards, a South Australian winemaker
- Hamilton Project, a think tank

== Educational institutions ==
- Hamilton Academy, Scotland (defunct)
- Hamilton and Alexandra College, Victoria, Australia
- Hamilton Boys' High School, New Zealand
- Hamilton College (disambiguation), multiple institutions
- Hamilton Grammar School, Scotland
- Hamilton University, a defunct unaccredited institution based in Evanston, Wyoming, US

== Mathematics and science ==
- Hamiltonian mechanics
- Hamilton–Jacobi equation, a set of physical equations in Hamiltonian mechanics
- Hamiltonian (quantum mechanics)
- Hamiltonian path, in mathematical graph theory, a path that visits each vertex in a graph exactly once
- Hamiltonian group, a non-abelian Dedekind group in algebra
- Hamilton Rating Scale for Depression

== Sport ==
- Hamilton Academical F.C., Scottish association football club which has youth departments and an affiliated women's team
- Hamilton Rage, also known as K–W United FC, Canadian soccer team (defunct)

== Vessels ==
- Hamilton (schooner), an American schooner class ship during the War of 1812
- SS Lewis Hamilton, a cargo ship with this name from 1947 to 1950
- USCGC Hamilton, U.S. Coast Guard cutters

== Other uses ==
- Hamilton railway station (disambiguation), stations of the name
- Hamilton convention, or Cappelletti, a bidding convention in contract bridge
- United States ten-dollar bill, a U.S. currency note, featuring a portrait of Founding Father Alexander Hamilton
- Hamilton Group, a north-eastern US geological structure
- Hamilton (crater), a lunar impact crater

== See also ==
- Hamilton's
- Hamilton Beach (disambiguation)
- Hamilton Branch (disambiguation)
- Hamilton Creek (disambiguation)
- Hamilton railway station (disambiguation)
- Hamilton River (disambiguation)
- Hamilton Township (disambiguation)
- Hamiltonian (disambiguation)
- Justice Hamilton (disambiguation)
