= List of things named after William Rowan Hamilton =

List of things named after William Rowan Hamilton:

- Cayley–Hamilton theorem
- Hamilton's equations
- Hamilton's principle
- Hamilton–Jacobi equation
  - Hamilton–Jacobi–Bellman equation, related equation in control theory
  - Hamilton–Jacobi–Einstein equation

== Hamiltonian ==
In both mathematics and physics (specifically mathematical physics):

the term Hamiltonian refers to any energy function defined by a Hamiltonian vector field, a particular vector field on a symplectic manifold; for related concepts see Hamiltonian (control theory) in control theory and Hamiltonian (quantum mechanics).

In physics and chemistry:

- Molecular Hamiltonian

In chemistry:

- Dyall Hamiltonian

More specifically, as an adjective it is used in the phrases:

In mathematical physics:

- Hamiltonian flow
- Hamiltonian function
- Hamiltonian mechanics in classical mechanics
- Hamiltonian optics
- Hamiltonian principle, see Hamilton's principle
- Hamiltonian system
- Hamiltonian vector field

In mathematics:

- Hamiltonian path, in graph theory
  - Hamiltonian cycle, a special case of a Hamiltonian path
- Hamiltonian group, in group theory
- Hamiltonian matrix
- Hamiltonian numbers (or quaternions)

In physics:

- Hamiltonian constraint
- Hamiltonian fluid mechanics
- Hamiltonian operator, see Hamiltonian (quantum mechanics)
- Hamiltonian lattice gauge theory

== By field ==
In both mathematics and physics (specifically mathematical physics):

the term Hamiltonian refers to any energy function defined by a Hamiltonian vector field, a particular vector field on a symplectic manifold, i.e., a Hamiltonian function;

- Hamiltonian field theory
- Hamiltonian flow
- Hamiltonian function, see above
- Hamiltonian system
- Hamiltonian vector field
- Hamiltonian mechanics in classical mechanics
- Hamilton's principle
- Hamilton–Jacobi equation

In mathematics :

- Hamiltonian path, in graph theory
  - Hamiltonian cycle, a special case of a Hamiltonian path
- Hamiltonian group, in group theory
- Hamiltonian matrix
- Hamiltonian numbers (or quaternions)

In physics and chemistry:

- Hamiltonian operator, see Hamiltonian (quantum mechanics)
- Molecular Hamiltonian

In physics:

- Hamiltonian constraint
- Hamiltonian fluid mechanics
- Hamiltonian lattice gauge theory

In Chemistry :

- Dyall Hamiltonian

In control theory:

- Hamiltonian (control theory)
- Hamilton–Jacobi–Bellman equation

== Other ==
- The Hamilton Building at Trinity College Dublin

== See also ==
- Hamiltonian (disambiguation)
