= Hamiltonian =

Hamiltonian may refer to:

- Hamiltonian mechanics, a formalism based on:
  - Hamiltonian (mechanics), a function that represents the total energy of a system
- Hamiltonian (quantum mechanics), an operator corresponding to the total energy of that system
  - Dyall Hamiltonian, a modified Hamiltonian with two-electron nature
  - Molecular Hamiltonian, the Hamiltonian operator representing the energy of the electrons and nuclei in a molecule
- Hamiltonian (control theory), a function used to solve a problem of optimal control for a dynamical system
- Hamiltonian path, a path in a graph that visits each vertex exactly once
- Hamiltonian matrix, a matrix with certain special properties commonly used in linear algebra
- Hamiltonian group, a non-abelian group the subgroups of which are all normal
- Hamiltonian economic program, the economic policies advocated by Alexander Hamilton, the first United States Secretary of the Treasury

== See also ==
- Alexander Hamilton (1755 or 1757–1804), American statesman and one of the Founding Fathers of the US
- Hamilton (disambiguation)
- List of things named after William Rowan Hamilton
- Hambletonian (disambiguation)
