= Hamilton Creek =

Hamilton Creek may refer to:

== Streams ==
=== Australia ===
- Hamilton Creek (Dee River tributary), a tributary of the Dee River in Queensland
- Hamilton Creek (South Australia), a seasonal creek on the Mawson Plateau in northern South Australia

=== United States ===
- Hamilton Creek (Cahuilla Creek tributary), in Riverside County, California
- Hamilton Creek (Santa Ana River tributary), a tributary of the Santa Ana River, California
- Hamilton Creek (Meramec River tributary), in Crawford and Washington Counties, Missouri
- Hamilton Creek (St. Louis County), in Missouri
- Hamilton Creek (Oregon), in Berlin, Oregon
- Hamilton Creek (Columbia River tributary), in Skamania County, Washington

== Settlements ==
- Hamilton Creek, Queensland, Australia

== See also ==
- Hamilton Branch (disambiguation)
