= Hamilton, New Jersey =

Hamilton, New Jersey is the name of several places in the U.S. state of New Jersey:

- Hamilton Township, Atlantic County, New Jersey
- Hamilton Township, Mercer County, New Jersey
- Hamilton, Monmouth County, New Jersey

== See also ==
- Hamilton Township (disambiguation)
