= USS Hamilton =

USS Hamilton may refer to more than one United States Navy ship:

- USS Hamilton (1812), a schooner acquired in 1812 and lost in 1813
- USS Hamilton (DD-141), a destroyer in commission from 1919 to 1922 and from 1930 to 1945, reclassified as a fast minesweeper (DMS-18) in 1941 and as an auxiliary (AG-111) in 1945
- USS Hamilton (FFG-66), a future Constellation-class frigate estimated to be finished in 2030.

== See also ==
- USS Alexander Hamilton
- Julia Hamilton (schooner), a patrol vessel in service from 1917 to 1918
- USS Paul Hamilton
- USCGC Hamilton
