= Hamilton City =

Hamilton City may refer to:

- Hamilton City, California, a community in the United States
- Hamilton City, Wyoming, a ghost town in the United States, better known as Miner's Delight
- Hamilton, New Zealand (Territorial Authority Hamilton City), New Zealand's fourth largest city
- Hamilton City SC, a Canadian professional soccer club in the Canadian Soccer League.

== See also ==
- Hamilton (disambiguation)
