= Hamilton Group (disambiguation) =

Hamilton Group is the north-eastern US geological structure.

== See also ==
- Hamiltonian group, mathematical structure
- Hamilton Project, research organization
- A predecessor of the Open Software Foundation
