= Hamilton Branch =

Hamilton Branch may refer to:

- Hamilton Branch (railway), a railway in Scotland
- Hamilton Branch, California, a census-designated place
- Hamilton Branch (Florida), a stream in Florida

== See also ==
- Hamilton Creek (disambiguation)
