= USCGC Hamilton =

USCGC Hamilton may refer to:

- USCGC Hamilton (WHEC-715), is a U.S. Coast Guard cutter in service from 1967 to 2011
- USCGC Hamilton (WMSL-753), is a U.S. Coast Guard cutter commissioned in 2014

== See also ==
- USCGC Alexander Hamilton (WPG-34)
- Hamilton-class cutter
- USS Alexander Hamilton
