= Hamilton College (disambiguation) =

Hamilton College is a liberal arts college in Clinton, New York, United States.

Hamilton College may also refer to:

- Hamilton and Alexandra College, Hamilton, Australia
- Hamilton College, South Lanarkshire, a Christian independent school in Hamilton, Scotland, UK
- Hamilton Literary and Theological Institution, a predecessor of Colgate University
- Hamilton Secondary College, Mitchell Park, Australia
- Hamilton Technical College, Davenport, Iowa, US
- Orchard Mead Academy, formerly Hamilton Community College, in Leicester, England, UK
- Hamilton College, New York (CDP), census-designated place in New York state

== Defunct institutions ==
- Hamilton University, in Evanston, Wyoming, US
- Hamilton College, a former constituent college of McMaster University in Hamilton, Canada
- Hamilton College (Kentucky), Lexington, Kentucky, US
- Hamilton College (Iowa), Cedar Rapids, Iowa, US
- Royal Hamilton College of Music, Hamilton, Ontario, Canada
