= Hamilton (automobile company) =

Defunct American motor vehicle manufacturer

Hamilton Motors Company
- Industry: Automobile manufacturing
- Predecessor: Alter Motor Car Company
- Founded: 1917; 109 years ago
- Founder: Guy Hamilton
- Defunct: 1921; 105 years ago
- Products: Model A-14

Apex Trucks advertisement (1920)

The Hamilton Motors Company was founded in 1917 by Guy Hamilton, after his Grand Haven, Michigan Alter Motor Car Company went bankrupt. The company produced only one car, the Model A-14, which was a four-cylinder, 28 hp touring car with a 112-inch (2,800 mm) wheelbase. He promised to make a six-cylinder car, but never did.

In 1918, the H. A. Oswald Engineering Company tried to resurrect the Hamilton as the Oswald, but it failed. However, Hamilton's Alter truck was produced until 1921.

== Production figures Hamilton Motors Company trucks ==
The pre-assigned serial numbers only indicate the maximum possible production quantity.

| Year | Production figures | Model | Load capacity | Serial number |
|---|---|---|---|---|
| 1917 | 59 | A „Panhard“ | 1 t | 100 to 158 |
| 1918 | 302 | A „Panhard“ | 1 t | 159 to 460 |
| | 162 | B „Panhard“ | 1.5 t | 1050 to 1210 |
| 1919 | 513 | A „Panhard“ | 1 t | 461 to 973 |
| | 582 | B „Panhard“ | 1.5 t | 1211 to 1792 |
| | 24 | E „Panhard“ | 2.5 t | 250 to 273 |
| 1920 | 410 | C „Apex“ | 1 t | 5039 to 5448 |
| | 427 | D „Apex“ | 1.5 t | 15041 to 15467 |
| | 408 | E „Apex“ | 2.5 t | 40017 to 40424 |
| 1921 | | | | |
| Sum | ~ 2.887 | | | |
