= Judge Hamilton =

Judge Hamilton may refer to:

- Clyde H. Hamilton (1934–2020), judge of the United States Court of Appeals for the Fourth Circuit
- David Hamilton (judge) (born 1957), judge of the United States Court of Appeals for the Seventh Circuit
- Elwood Hamilton (1883–1945), judge of the United States Court of Appeals for the Sixth Circuit
- Jean Constance Hamilton (born 1945), judge of the United States District Court for the Eastern District of Missouri
- Peter J. Hamilton (1859–1927), judge of the United States District Court for the District of Puerto Rico
- Phyllis J. Hamilton (born 1952), judge of the United States District Court for the Northern District of California

== See also ==
- Justice Hamilton (disambiguation)
