= Hambletonian =

Hambletonian may refer to:

- Hambletonian (horse) (1792–1818), an English Thoroughbred racehorse, sometimes known as Hambletonian I
- Hambletonian 10 (1849–1876), an American foundation sire of the harness racing breed known as the Standardbred.
- Hambletonian Stakes, a major American harness race
- The Hambletonian Classic, a New Zealand trotting race

== See also ==
- Hamiltonian (disambiguation)
