= Hamilton River =

Hamilton River may refer to several places:

- Hamilton River (New Zealand), a tributary of Wairau River in New Zealand
- Hamilton River (Queensland), a tributary of Georgina River in Australia
- Hamilton River (Western Australia), a tributary of Collie River in Australia
- Hamilton River, Newfoundland and Labrador, community

== See also ==
- The Churchill River (Atlantic) also was called Hamilton River up to 1965
