= USS Paul Hamilton =

Three ships of the United States Navy have borne the name USS Paul Hamilton, named in honor of Paul Hamilton, (1762–1819), a veteran of the American War of Independence and the third Secretary of the Navy.

- The first, USS Paul Hamilton (DD-307), was a Clemson-class destroyer, launched in 1919 and scrapped in 1931.
- The second, USS Paul Hamilton (DD-590), was a Fletcher-class destroyer, launched in 1943 and struck in 1968.
- The third, USS Paul Hamilton (DDG-60), is an Arleigh Burke-class destroyer, launched in 1993.

== See also ==
- SS Paul Hamilton, a Liberty ship
- USS Hamilton, ships of a similar name
