= Hamilton railway station =

Hamilton railway station or Hamilton station may refer to:

== Australia ==
- Hamilton railway station, New South Wales in Hamilton, New South Wales, Australia
- Hamilton railway station, Victoria in Hamilton, Victoria, Australia

== Canada ==
- Hamilton GO Centre in Hamilton, Ontario, Canada
- LIUNA Station, the former CNR station in Hamilton, Ontario, Canada

== New Zealand ==
- Hamilton railway station (New Zealand) in Hamilton, New Zealand
- Hamilton Central railway station (New Zealand), a defunct railway station in Hamilton, New Zealand

== United Kingdom ==
- Hamilton Central railway station, in Hamilton, South Lanarkshire, Scotland
- Hamilton West railway station, in Hamilton, South Lanarkshire, Scotland
- Hamilton railway station (North British Railway), a former station in Hamilton, South Lanarkshire, Scotland

== United States ==
- Hamilton station (NJ Transit), in Hamilton, New Jersey United States
- Hamilton Avenue station, River Line Light Rail
- Hamilton station (Ohio), a former station in Ohio, United States
- Hamilton station (VTA), a light rail station in Campbell, California
- Hamilton E. Holmes station, a rapid transit station in Atlanta, Georgia

== See also ==
- Hamilton (disambiguation)
