= USS Paul Hamilton (DD-590) =

Fletcher-class destroyer

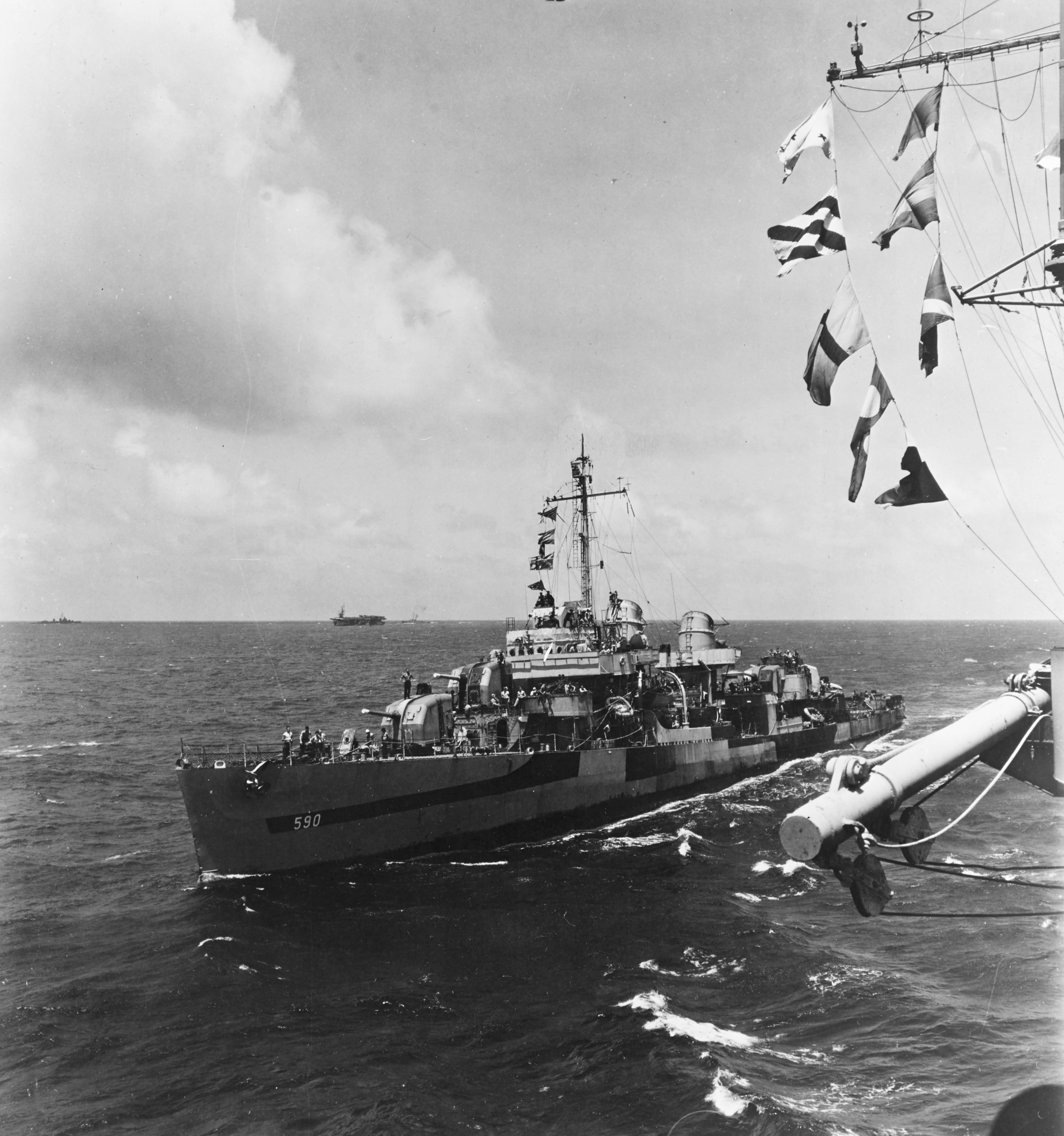
- USS Paul Hamilton (DD-590) during the Iwo Jima campaign, 11 March 1945. She is wearing camouflage Measure 32, Design 3d.

History

United States
- Namesake: Paul Hamilton
- Builder: Charleston Navy Yard
- Laid down: 20 January 1943
- Launched: 7 April 1943
- Commissioned: 25 October 1943
- Decommissioned: 24 September 1945
- Stricken: 1 May 1968
- Fate: Sold for scrap, 2 April 1970

General characteristics
- Class & type: Fletcher-class destroyer
- Displacement: 2,050 tons
- Length: 376 ft 6 in (114.7 m)
- Beam: 39 ft 8 in (12.1 m)
- Draft: 17 ft 9 in (5.4 m)
- Propulsion: 60,000 shp (45 MW); 2 propellers
- Speed: 35 knots (65 km/h; 40 mph)
- Range: 6500 nmi. (12,000 km) at 15 kt
- Complement: 329
- Armament: 5 × 5 in (130 mm), 4 × 40 mm AA guns, 4 × 20 mm AA guns, 10 × 21 inch (533 mm) torpedo tubes, 6 × depth charge projectors, 2 × depth charge tracks

USS Paul Hamilton (DD-590), a Fletcher-class destroyer, was the second ship of the United States Navy to be named for Navy Secretary Paul Hamilton (1762–1816).

Paul Hamilton was laid down 20 January 1943 by the Charleston Navy Yard; launched 7 April 1943; sponsored by Mrs. William Dewar Gordon; and commissioned 25 October 1943.

== History ==
Following shakedown off Bermuda, Paul Hamilton served in lower Chesapeake Bay, out of Norfolk, Va., as a destroyer training unit 8 January to 19 April 1944. She departed Norfolk 25 April and steamed via Aruba, Dutch West Indies, and the Panama Canal to Pearl Harbor, Hawaii, where she arrived 21 May 1944.

From 13 June to 12 August, Paul Hamilton formed part of the protective screen for the replenishment aircraft and fueling groups that serviced the 3d Fleet during the landing at Saipan 15 June. She accompanied Task Force 58 (TF 58) west during the Battle of the Philippine Sea 19 and 20 June. She departed for Manus Island, Admiralty Islands, 20 August, in company with escort carriers and fleet oilers.

From 1 September to 3 October, Paul Hamilton served as a screening vessel for the replenishment aircraft and fueling groups that serviced the 3d Fleet during the capture of the southern Palau Islands. She played a similar role for the 3d Fleet 4 October to 15 November during air strikes against Okinawa, Luzon, Formosa, the Visayan Islands, and the Japanese fleet.

She proceeded via Hollandia, New Guinea, to Leyte Gulf, Philippines, where she patrolled 7 to 11 December to protect shipping from enemy surface attacks. She screened for the amphibious assault force that landed on Mindoro Island, Philippines, 15 December, and shot down three enemy planes that day. From 27 December to 2 January 1945 she screened ships resupplying U.S. Army forces on Mindoro.

From 3 to 21 January, Paul Hamilton screened for the assault on Lingayen Gulf, Philippines. She rescued 73 survivors from Ommaney Bay (CVE-79) on the 4th.

Following replenishment at Ulithi, Western Carolines, Paul Hamilton participated in the assault on Iwo Jima. She contributed shore bombardment, fire support and pilot rescue, 10 February to 11 March. Following rescue efforts in the Volcano and Bonin Islands, she joined Task Force 54 (TF 54) to provide fire support during the Battle of Okinawa for the landings at Kerama Retto, Okinawa Jima, Tsuken Shima, Ie Shima, Iheya Shima, and Aguni Shima, during deployment 21 March to 17 June.

She departed Okinawa 17 June 1945, and proceeded via Guam, Eniwetok, and Pearl Harbor to San Diego, Calif. where she arrived 8 July for overhaul. Paul Hamilton reported to the Pacific Reserve Fleet 24 September 1945 and remained inactive until struck from the Naval Vessel Register 1 May 1968. She was sold 2 April 1970 and broken up for scrap.

Paul Hamilton received seven battle stars for World War II service.

== See also ==
See USS Paul Hamilton for other ships of the same name.
