= Justice Hamilton =

Justice Hamilton may refer to:

- Andrew Jackson Hamilton (1815–1875), associate justice of the Texas Supreme Court
- John Hamilton (judge) (fl. 1960s–2000s), judge of the Supreme Court of New South Wales, 1997–2009
- Orris L. Hamilton (1914–1994), associate justice of the Washington Supreme Court
- Robert W. Hamilton (judge) (1899–1981), justice of the Texas Supreme Court
- Liam Hamilton (1928–2000), former chief justice of Ireland, former justice of the Supreme Court of Ireland, and former President of the High Court
- Wilson H. Hamilton (1877–1949), associate justice of the Iowa Supreme Court

== See also ==
- Judge Hamilton (disambiguation)
