= Hamilton Branch (Florida) =

Stream in Florida, United States

Physical characteristics
- Source
  - coordinates: 28.0058557°N 82.0409176°W
- Mouth
  - coordinates: 27.9833565°N 82.0548072°W

Hamilton Branch is a stream in Polk County, Florida, in the United States.

Hamilton Branch bears the name of George Hamilton, an early settler.

== See also ==
- List of rivers of Florida
