= Hamilton Dome =

Mountain in the state of California

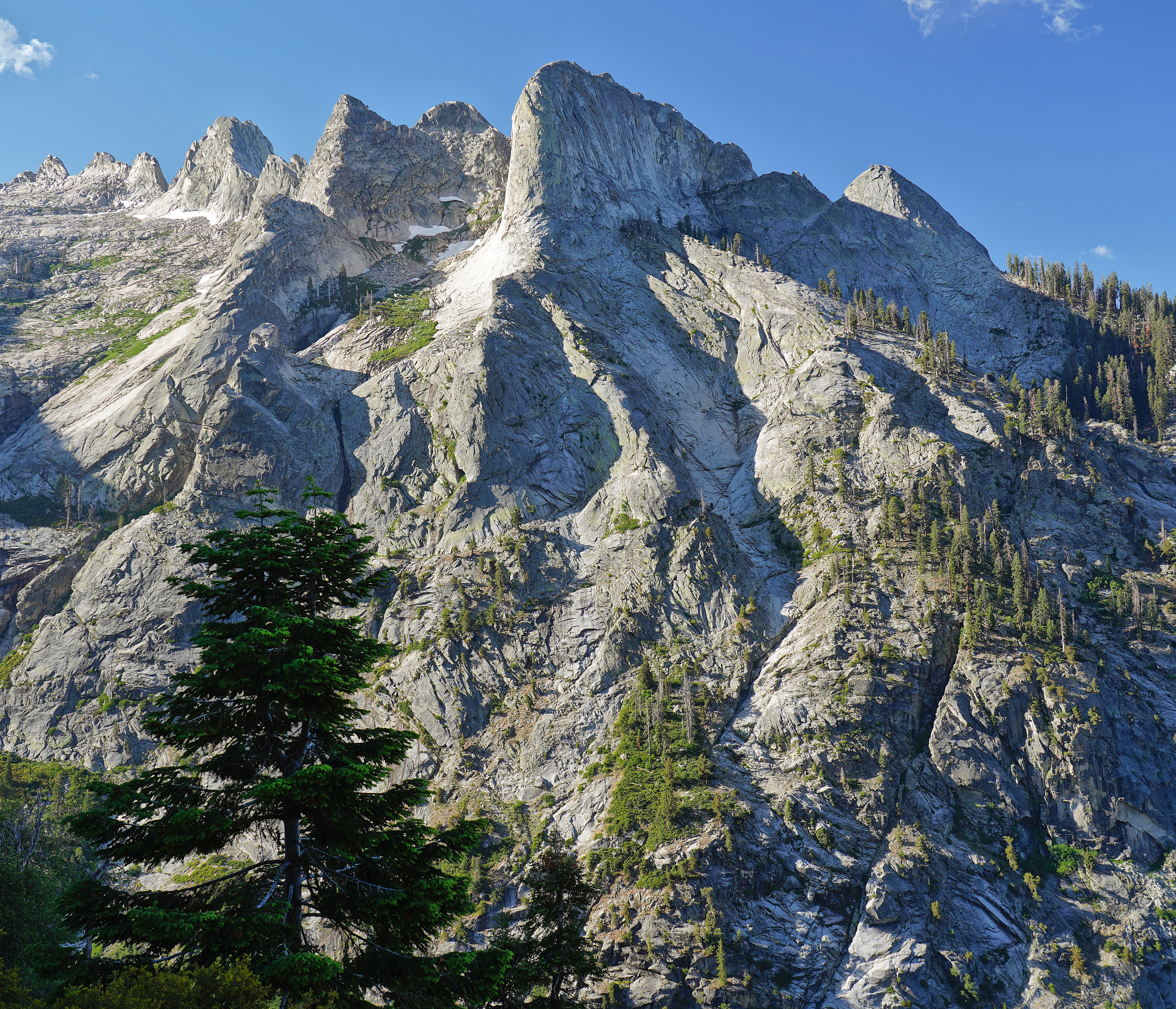
- North aspect

Highest point
- Elevation: 9,764 ft (2,976 m)
- Prominence: 315 ft (96 m)
- Parent peak: Hamilton Towers (10,018 ft)
- Isolation: 0.4 mi (0.64 km)
- Coordinates: 36°33′18″N 118°35′38″W

Geography
- Location within California Location within the United States
- Country: United States
- State: California
- County: Tulare
- Protected area: Sequoia National Park
- Parent range: Sierra Nevada
- Topo map: USGS Triple Divide Peak

Geology
- Rock age: Cretaceous
- Mountain type: Granite dome
- Rock type: Granite

Climbing
- First ascent: 1936
- Easiest route: class 5.6

Hamilton Dome is a mountain in California, United States.

== Description ==
Hamilton Dome is a 9,764-foot-elevation (2,976-meter) summit located in the Sierra Nevada mountain range in Tulare County of California. It is situated above Hamilton Lakes along the west side of the Great Western Divide in Sequoia National Park. Topographic relief is significant as the summit rises approximately 1,750 feet (533 meters) above the Hamilton Lakes in one mile (1.6 km), and 3,200 feet (975 meters) above Hamilton Creek in one mile (1.6 km). Precipitation runoff from this mountain drains into tributaries of the Middle Fork of the Kaweah River. The first ascent of the summit was accomplished in 1936 by Dick Johnson and party via the east gully. This landform's toponym has not been officially adopted by the U.S. Board on Geographic Names, however Hamilton Lakes and Hamiliton Creek are official names which commemorate James Hamilton who owned nearby Redwood Meadow and Wet Meadow (later renamed Little Bearpaw Meadow).

== Climbing routes ==
Rock climbing routes on Hamilton Dome:

- East Gully - class 5.6 - Dick Johnson and party - (1936)
- North Arete - class 5.10 - Don Lauria, T.M. Herbert - (1971)
- Before the Jury - class 5.11 - Dave Nettle, Richard Leversee - (1996)
- North Arete Left Side - class 5.10 - Brian C., Chris W., Paul L. - (2003)
- Subliminal Verses - class 5.10 - Vitaliy Musiyenko, Brian Prince - (2015)

== Climate ==
According to the Köppen climate classification system, Hamilton Dome is located in an alpine climate zone. Weather fronts originating in the Pacific Ocean travel east toward the Sierra Nevada mountains. As fronts approach, they are forced upward by the peaks (orographic lift), causing them to drop their moisture in the form of rain or snowfall onto the range.

== Gallery ==
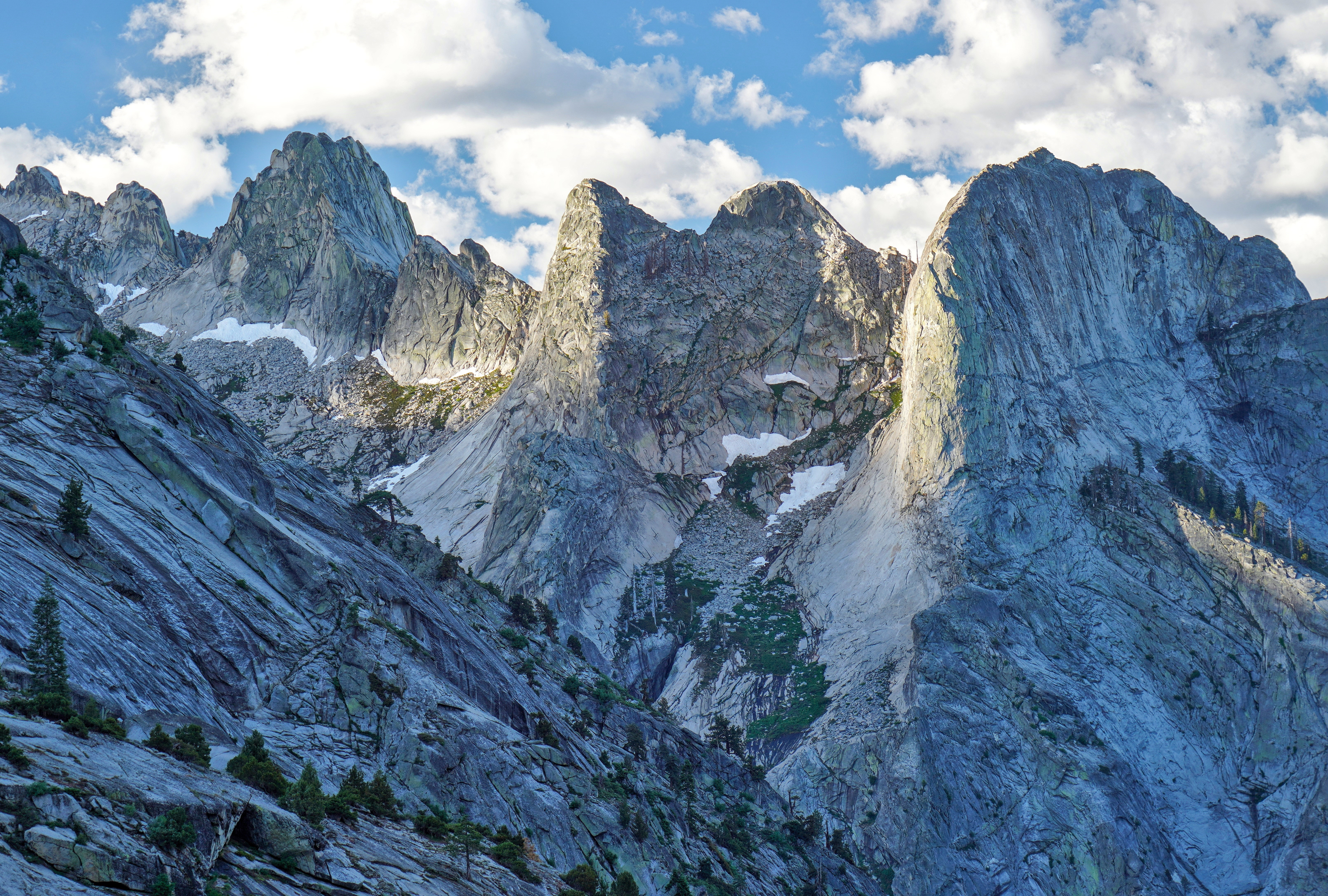
Hamilton Dome to right, Hamilton Towers to left

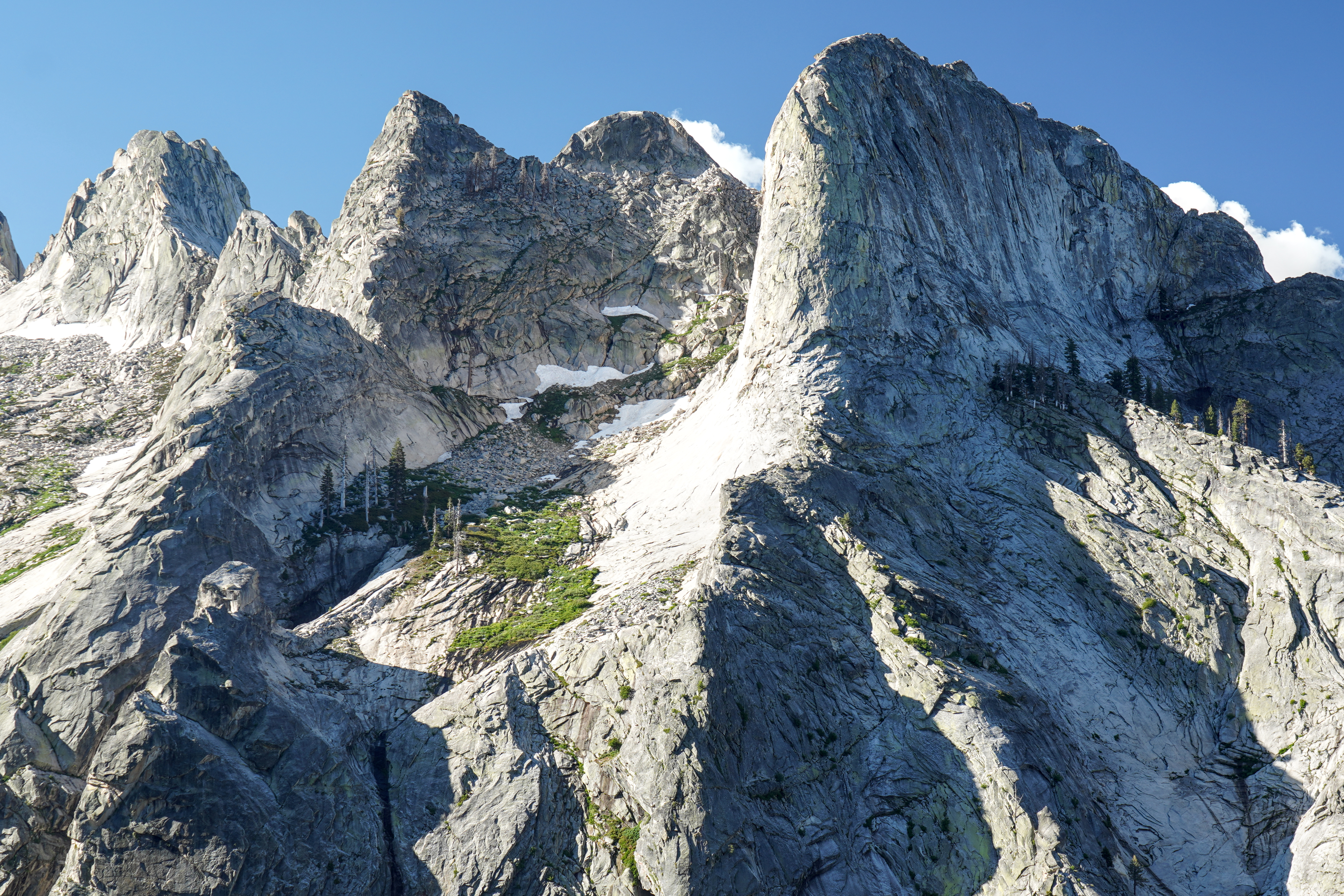
Hamilton Dome to right, Hamilton Towers to left

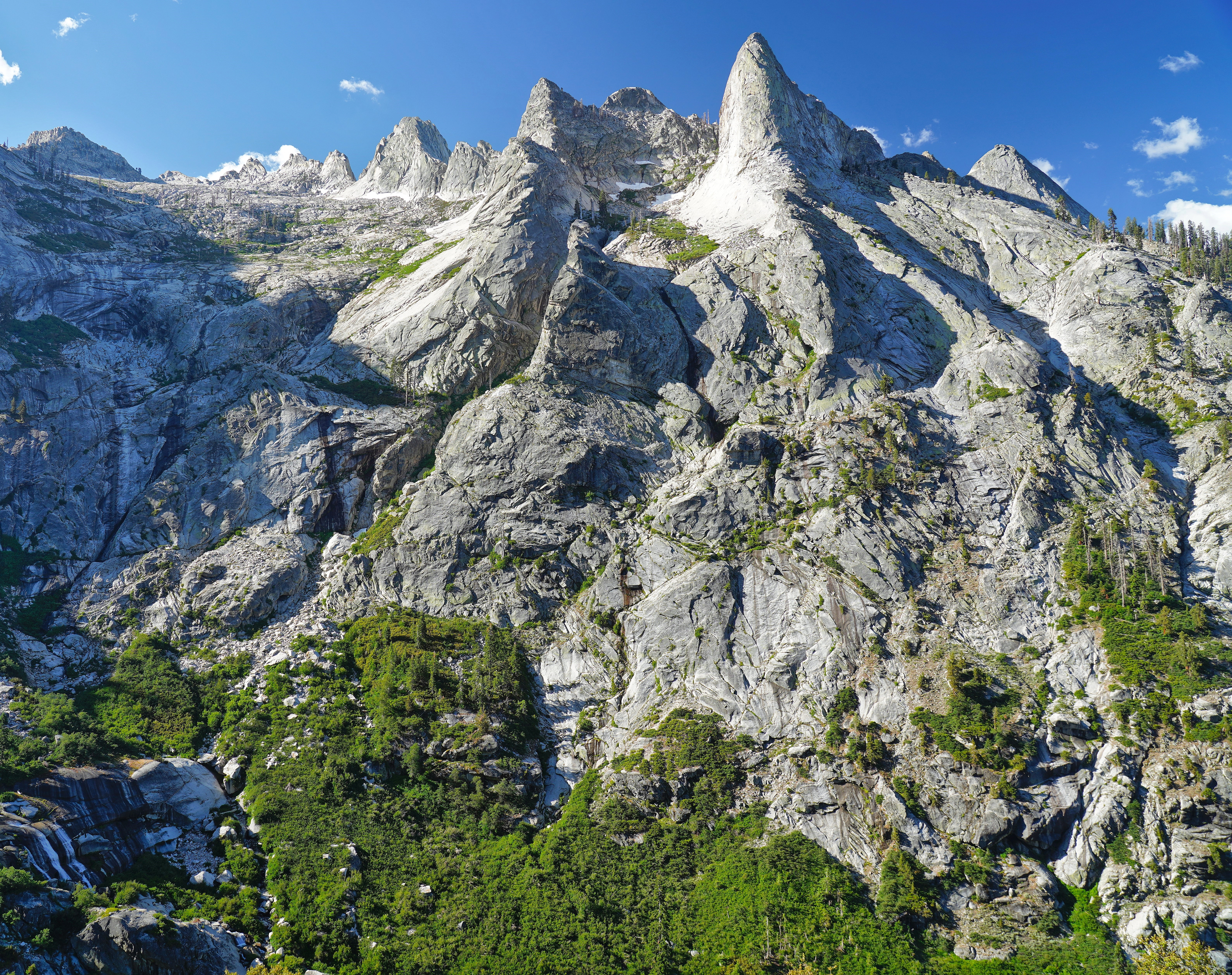
North aspect of Hamilton Dome

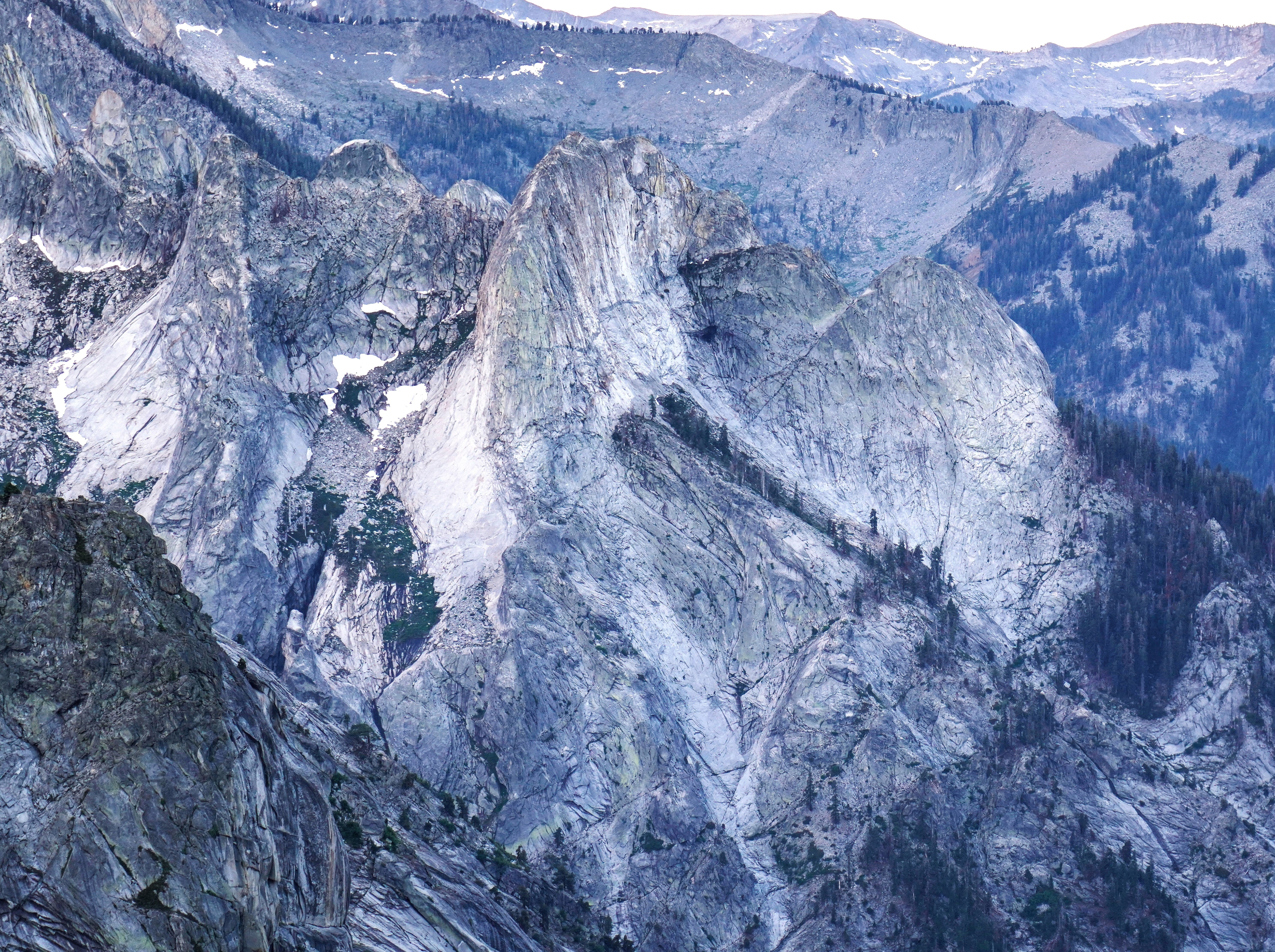
Hamilton Dome centered, viewed from Elizabeth Pass

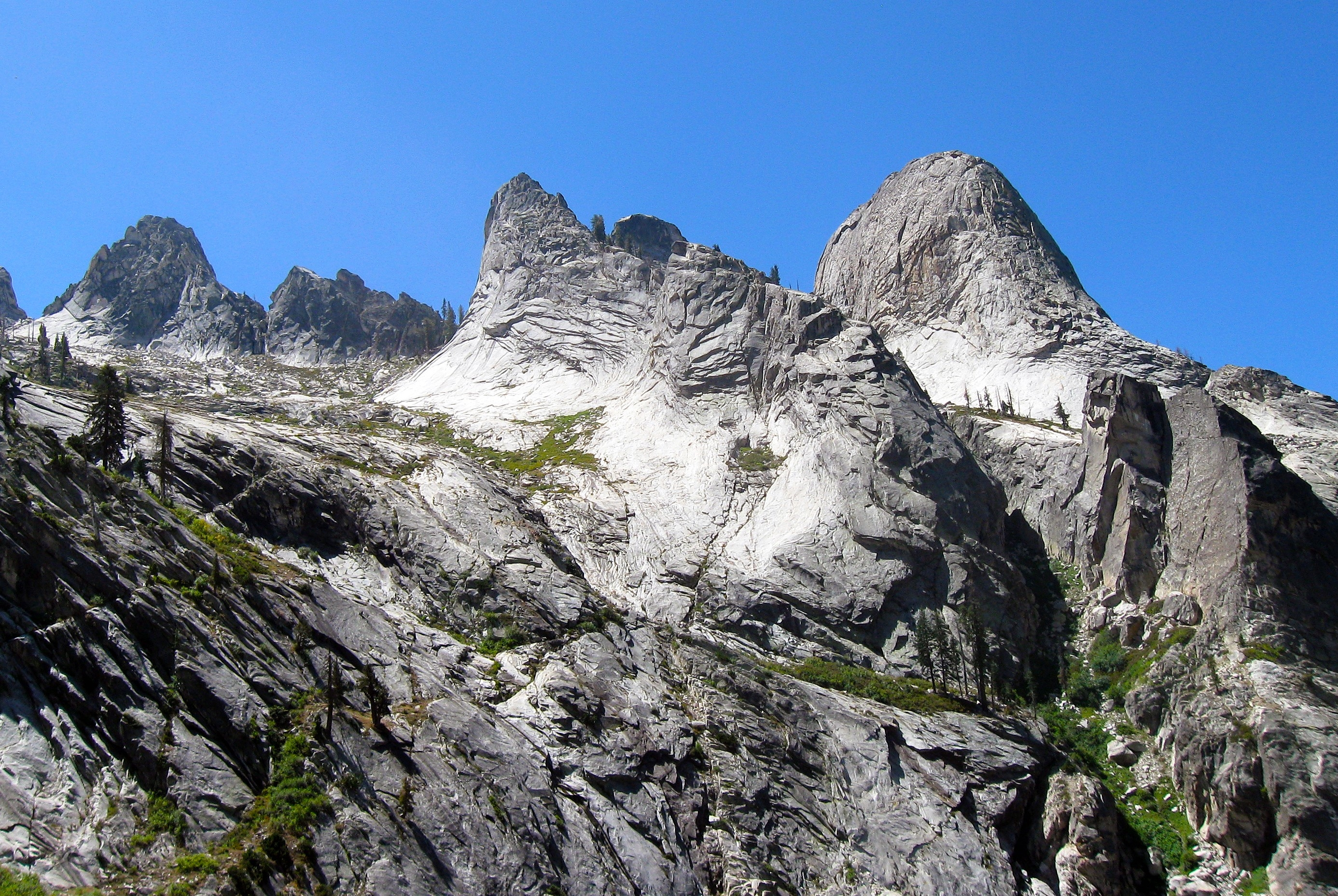
Hamilton Towers and Hamilton Dome

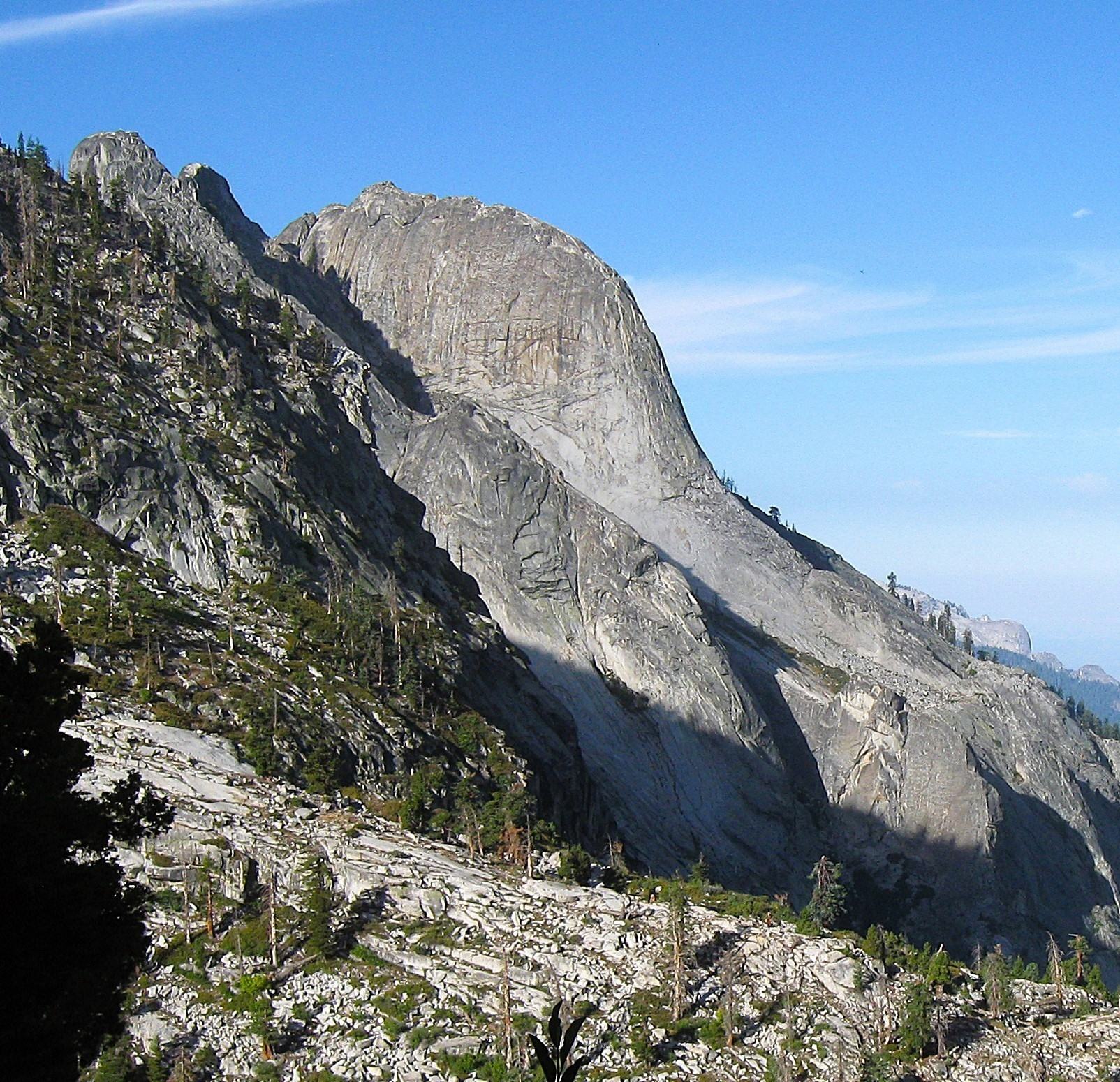
Northeast aspect

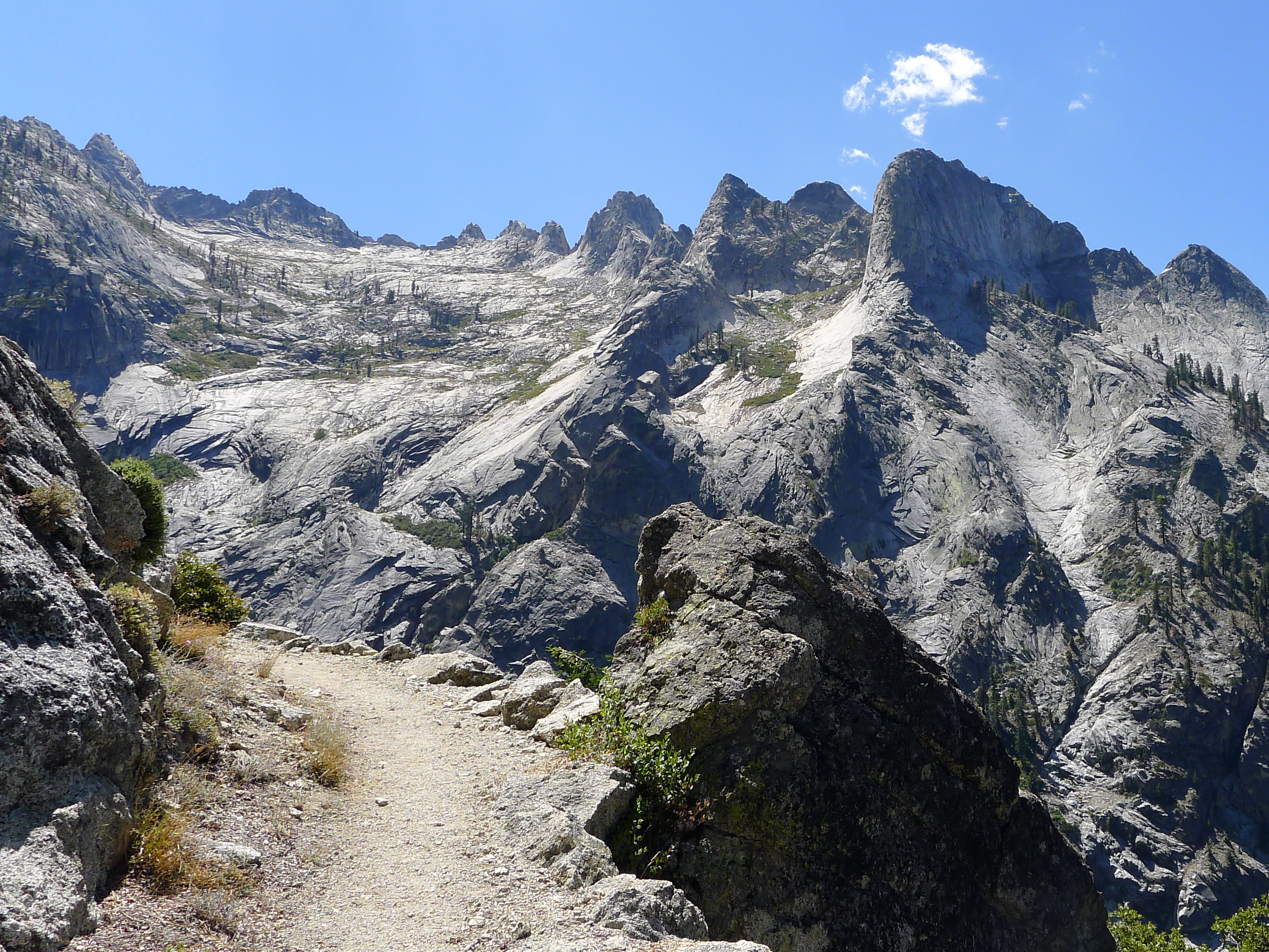
Hamilton Dome (right) seen from High Sierra Trail

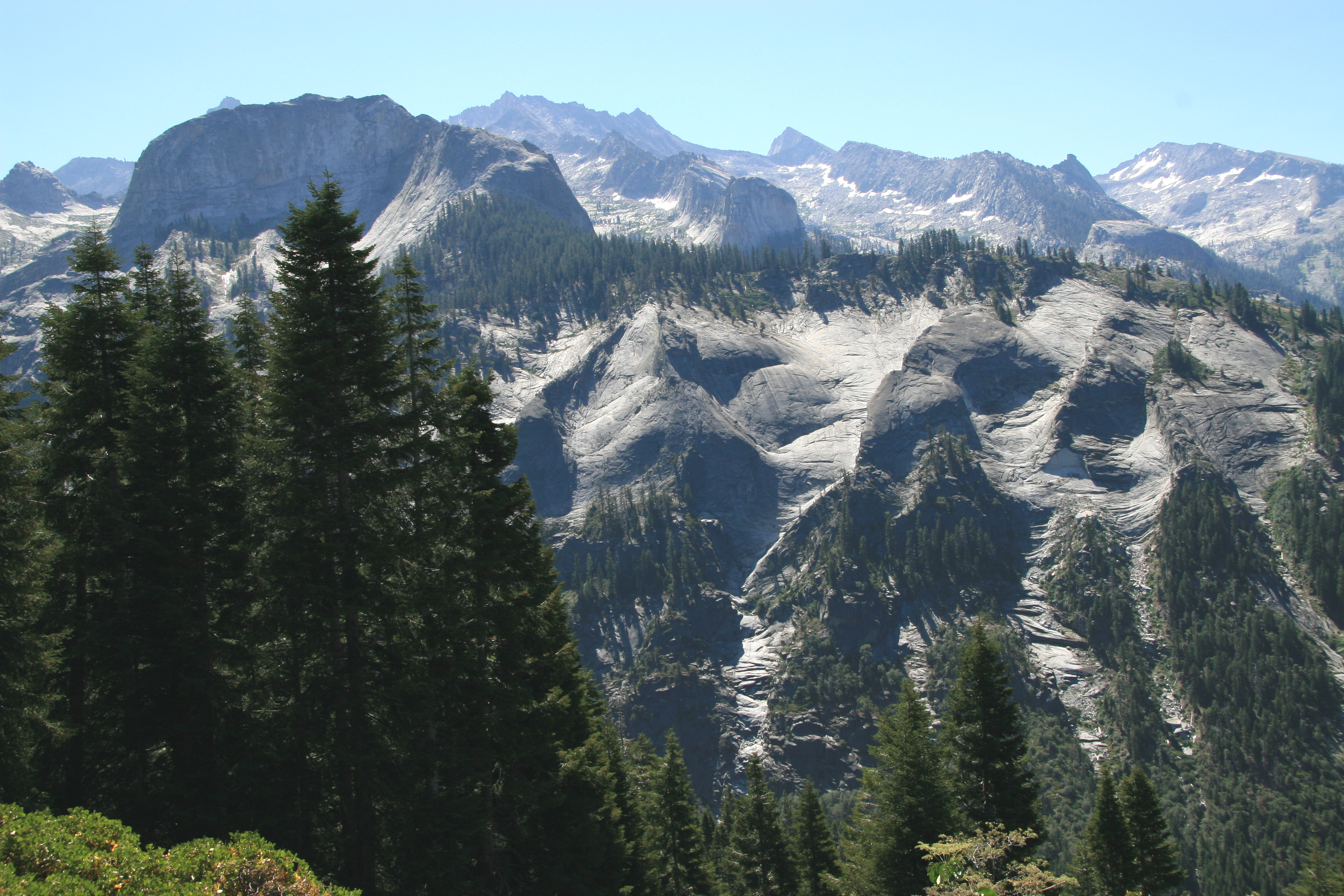
West aspect in upper left, viewed from Bearpaw Meadow High Sierra Camp

== See also ==
- List of mountain peaks of California
