= Hamilton Beach =

Hamilton Beach may refer to:

- Hamilton Beach, Queens, a neighborhood in New York City
  - Hamilton Beach station, a former Long Island Rail Road station
- Hamilton Beach Brands, a manufacturer of home appliances and commercial equipment
