= Hamilton Creek (Columbia River tributary) =

Coordinates: 45°38′05″N 121°58′54″W

Hamilton Creek is a tributary stream of the Columbia River in Skamania County, in the U.S. state of Washington.

== History ==
Hamilton Creek was named after Samuel Milton Hamilton, an early settler.

== See also ==
- List of rivers of Washington (state)
