= Hamilton Township, Lonoke County, Arkansas =

Hamilton Township
- Township
- Location within Arkansas
- Coordinates: 34°38′15.3″N 91°42′45.5″W
- Country: United States
- State: Arkansas
- County: Lonoke

Area
  - Total: 37.25 sq mi (96.5 km^{2})
  - Land: 36.8 sq mi (95 km^{2})
  - Water: 0.45 sq mi (1.2 km^{2})
- Elevation: 213 ft (65 m)

Population (2010)
  - Total: 148
  - Density: 4/sq mi (1.5/km^{2})
- Time zone: UTC-6 (CST)
  - Summer (DST): UTC-5 (CDT)
- ZIP code: 72730
- Area code: 870
- GNIS feature ID: 68822

The Township of Hamilton is one of twenty-nine townships in Lonoke County, Arkansas, USA. As of the 2010 census, its population was 148.

== Geography ==
According to the United States Census Bureau, Hamilton Township covers an area of 37.3 square miles (96.5 km^{2}), with 36.8 square miles (95.3 km^{2}) of it being land and 0.46 square miles (1.2 km^{2}) of it, or 1.20%, being water.

=== Cemetery ===
The township contains Hamilton Cemetery.

=== Major routes ===
- Arkansas Highway 13
- Arkansas Highway 232
