= USCGC Hamilton (WMSL-753) =

Legend-class U.S. Coast Guard cutter

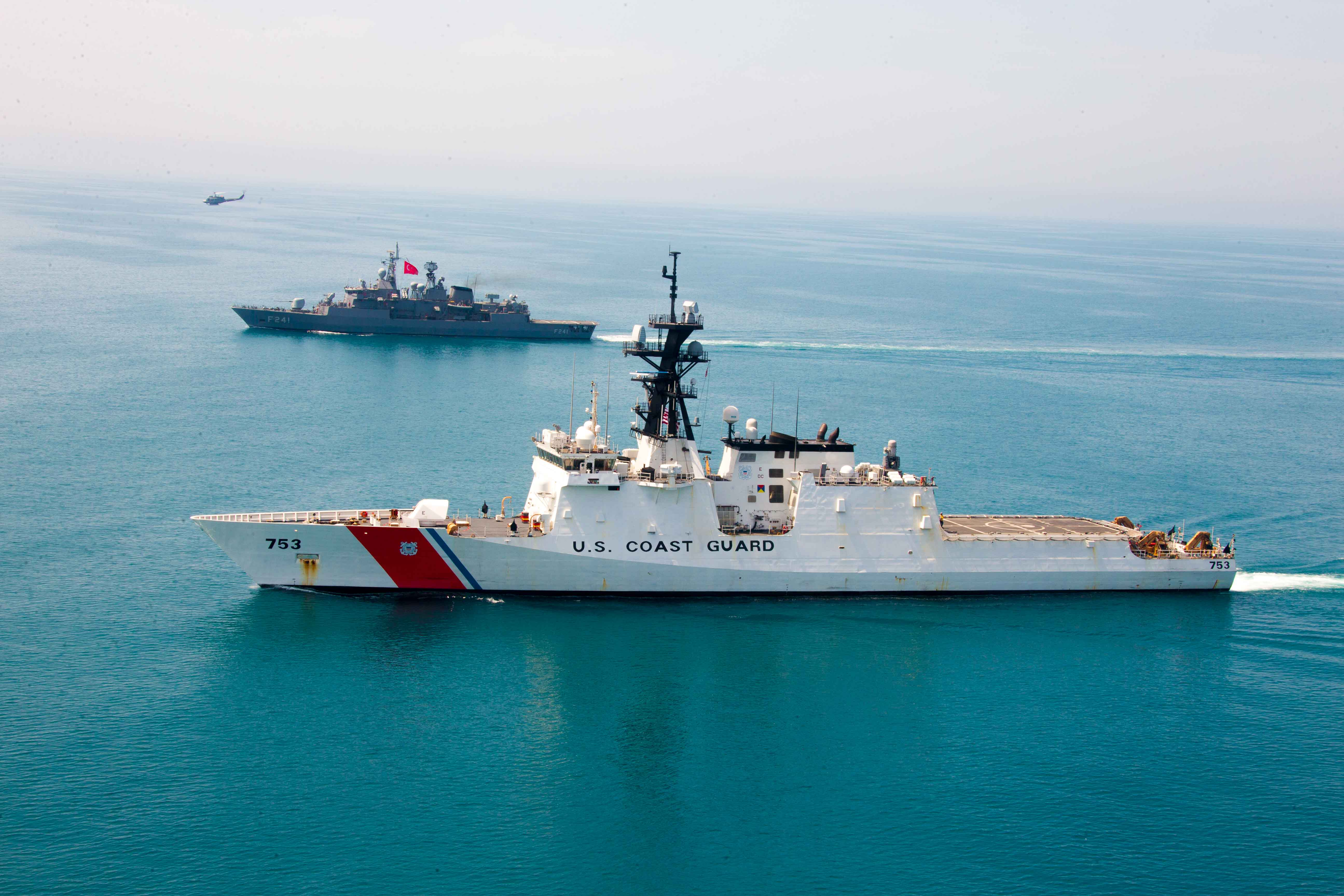

History

United States
- Namesake: Alexander Hamilton
- Ordered: November 2010
- Builder: Huntington Ingalls Industries, Pascagoula, Mississippi
- Laid down: 5 September 2012
- Launched: 10 August 2013
- Sponsored by: Linda Kapral Papp
- Christened: 26 October 2013
- Commissioned: 6 December 2014
- Identification: MMSI number: 368883000; Callsign: NMAG
- Status: In service
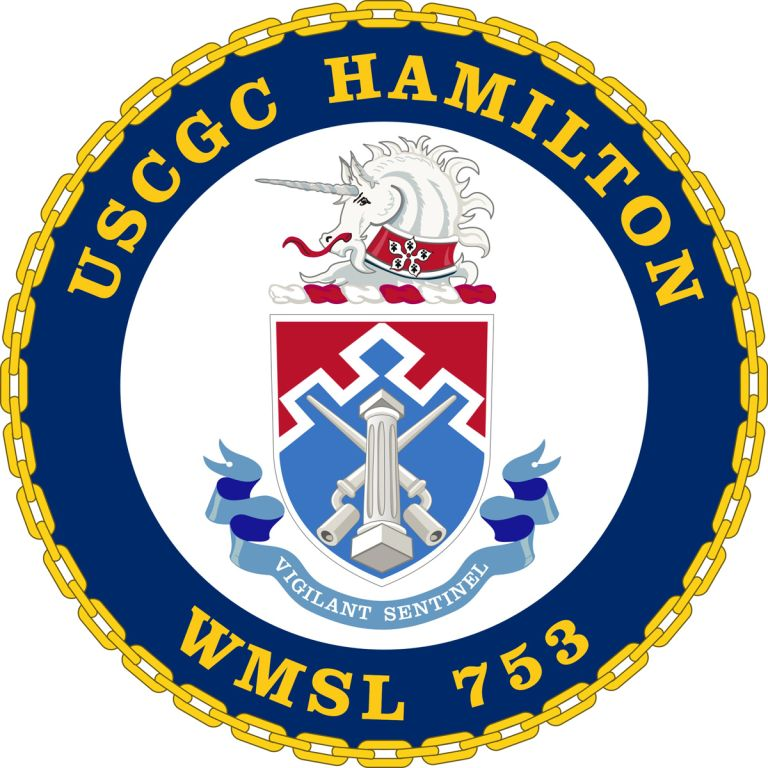
- Badge

General characteristics
- Class & type: Legend-class cutter
- Displacement: 4500 LT
- Length: 418 ft (127 m)
- Beam: 54 ft (16 m)
- Height: 140 ft (43 m)
- Draft: 22.5 ft (6.9 m)
- Decks: 4
- Propulsion: Combined diesel and gas
- Speed: 28+ knots
- Range: 12,000 nm
- Endurance: 60 days
- Complement: 111 (15 Officers, 15 CPO, 81 Enlisted) and can carry up to 148 depending on mission
- Sensors & processing systems: EADS 3D TRS-16 AN/SPS-75 Air Search Radar; SPQ-9B Fire Control Radar; AN/SPS-73 Surface Search Radar; AN/SLQ-32
- Electronic warfare & decoys: AN/SLQ-32 Electronic Warfare System; 2 SRBOC/ 2 x NULKA countermeasures chaff/rapid decoy launcher
- Armament: 1 x MK 110 57mm gun; 1 × 20 mm Block 1B Phalanx Close-In Weapons System; 4 × .50 caliber machine guns; 2 × M240B 7.62 mm machine guns
- Armor: Ballistic protection for main gun
- Aircraft carried: 2 x MH-65C Dolphin MCH, or 4 x VUAV or 1 x MH-65C Dolphin MCH and 2 x VUAV
- Aviation facilities: 50-by-80-foot (15 m × 24 m) flight deck, hangar for all aircraft

USCGC Hamilton (WMSL-753) is the fourth Legend-class cutter, also known as the National Security Cutter (NSC), of the United States Coast Guard. She is the fifth cutter named after Founding Father Alexander Hamilton, who was the first United States Secretary of the Treasury and in that position requested the formation of the United States Coast Guard (as the United States Revenue Cutter Service). The cutter's sponsor is Linda Kapral Papp, the wife of Coast Guard Commandant Robert J. Papp Jr.

Construction began in September 2011 by Northrop Grumman's Ship System Ingalls Shipyard in Pascagoula, Mississippi, with the keel was laid on 5 September 2012. Hamilton was launched on 10 August 2013, and her christening was on 26 October 2013. She was delivered to the Coast Guard in September 2014. The cutter is homeported at Joint Base Charleston in North Charleston, South Carolina.

In January 2020 Hamilton became the first NSC to participate in a Navy Composite Training Unit Exercise, integrated with USS Dwight D. Eisenhower and Carrier Strike Group 10. After operating with the Carrier Strike Group, the cutter patrolled the Eastern Pacific Ocean in support of Joint Interagency Task Force (JIATF) South. The cutter returned in April after the 80-day patrol, during which she captured three drug smuggling vessels, including two narco-subs, and eight suspected drug smugglers. After the patrol she offloaded $324 million worth of cocaine and marijuana.

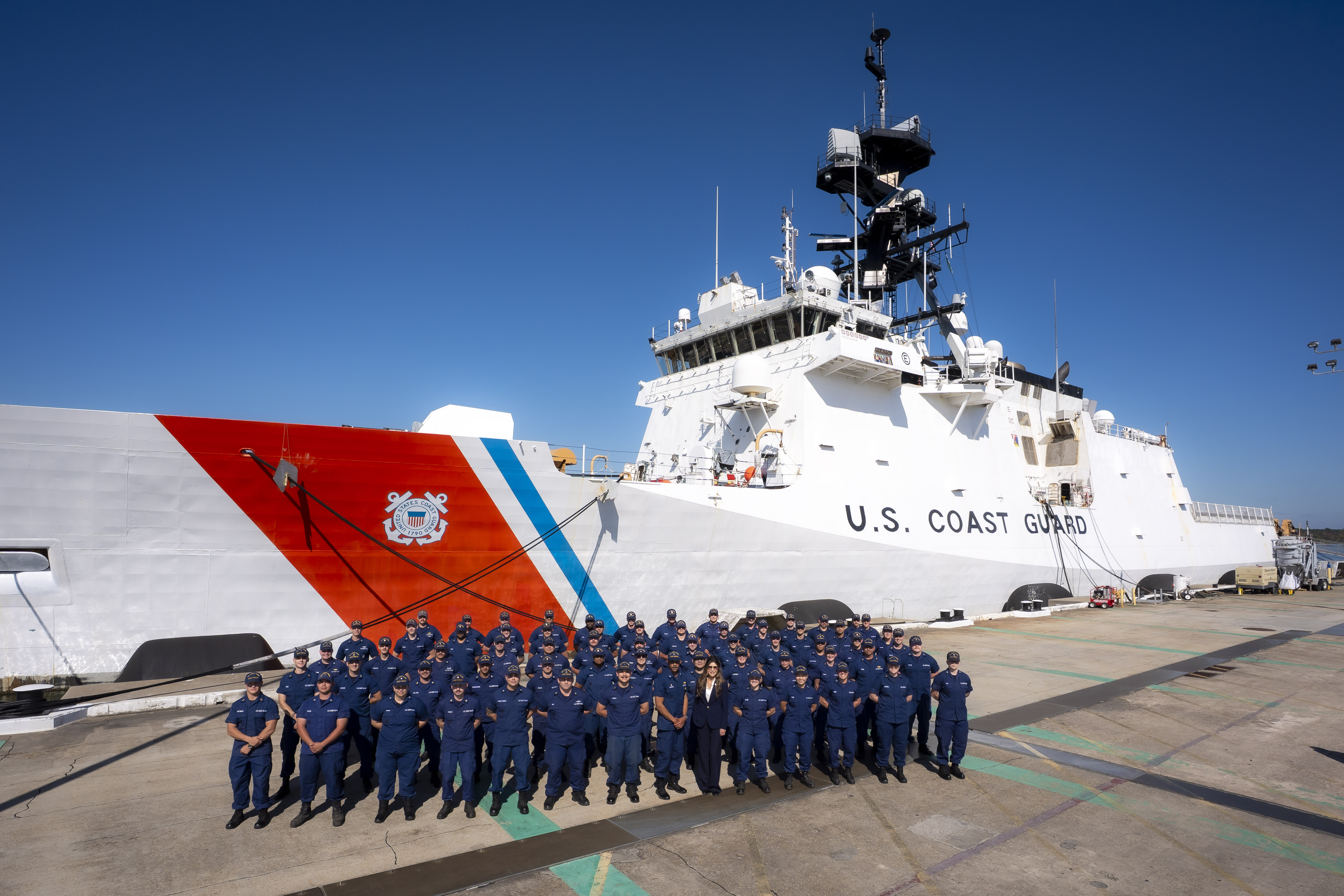
U.S. Coast Guard Base Charleston, South Carolina in 2025

== Notable interdictions ==
- 15 December 2016 - Cutter USCGC Hamilton offloaded 26.5 tons of cocaine estimated at a worth of US$715 million after conducting interdiction operations beside the Royal Canadian Navy since 1 October that same year.
- 27 August 2020 - USCGC Hamilton offloaded 11,500 pounds of cocaine and 17,000 pounds of marijuana estimated at an estimated worth of $228 million after a patrol in the Eastern Pacific Ocean alongside USCGC Resolute and US Navy patrol boat USS Shamal.
- 24 November 2021- USCGC Hamilton offloaded 26,250 pounds of cocaine and 3,700 pounds of marijuana estimated at a worth of US$504 million. During the deployment it also intercepted 199 Haitian migrants.

== Black Sea patrol ==
In May 2021 Hamilton patrolled the Black Sea for nearly three weeks, conducting training exercises with several NATO and friendly navies, including Turkey, Romania, Ukraine, and Georgia. This was the first visit to the Black Sea by a Coast Guard cutter since USCGC Dallas (WHEC-716) in 2008. The patrol was monitored by Russia whose foreign ministry issued a statement condemning the cutter's presence.

== See also ==
- USCGC Bertholf (WMSL-750)
- USCGC Waesche (WMSL-751)
- USCGC Stratton (WMSL-752)
- USCGC James (WMSL-754)
- USCGC Hamilton (WHEC-715)
- Integrated Deepwater System Program
- USS Alexander Hamilton
