= Hamilton River (New Zealand) =

River of New Zealand

Location
- Country: New Zealand
- Region: Marlborough

Physical characteristics
- Source: Fifteen Mile Spur
  - location: St Arnaud Range
  - coordinates: 41°59′56″S 172°49′10″E
  - elevation: 1,740 m (5,710 ft)
- Mouth: Wairau River
  - location: Near Irishmans Flat
  - coordinates: 41°57′14″S 172°53′54″E
  - elevation: 740 m (2,430 ft)
- Length: 10 km (6.2 mi)

The Hamilton River is a river in the Marlborough region of New Zealand's South Island. It is a tributary of the Wairau River, which at 170 kilometres (110 mi) is one of the longest rivers in New Zealand. The Hamilton River rises on Fifteen Mile Spur, an offshoot of the St Arnaud Range. A marked route runs alongside the river's true right bank, which is used by back-country trampers to gain access to the Range.
