= USS Alexander Hamilton =

USS Alexander Hamilton may refer to the following ships operated by the United States government:

== United States Navy ==
- USS Alexander Hamilton (1871), was a U.S. Navy revenue cutter in service from 1871 to 1906, and a participant in the Spanish–American War
- USS Alexander Hamilton (SSBN-617), was a U.S. Navy submarine in service from 1963 to 1993

== United States Coast Guard ==
- USCGC Alexander Hamilton (WPG-34), was a U.S. Coast Guard cutter commissioned in 1937 and sunk by a U-boat in January 1942
- USCGC Hamilton (WHEC-715), was a U.S. Coast Guard cutter in service from 1967 to 2011
- USCGC Hamilton (WMSL-753), is a U.S. Coast Guard cutter commissioned in 2014.

== See also ==
- USS Hamilton
