= Hamilton Creek (St. Louis County) =

Stream in the American state of Missouri

Coordinates: 38.5408868°N 90.6240149°W

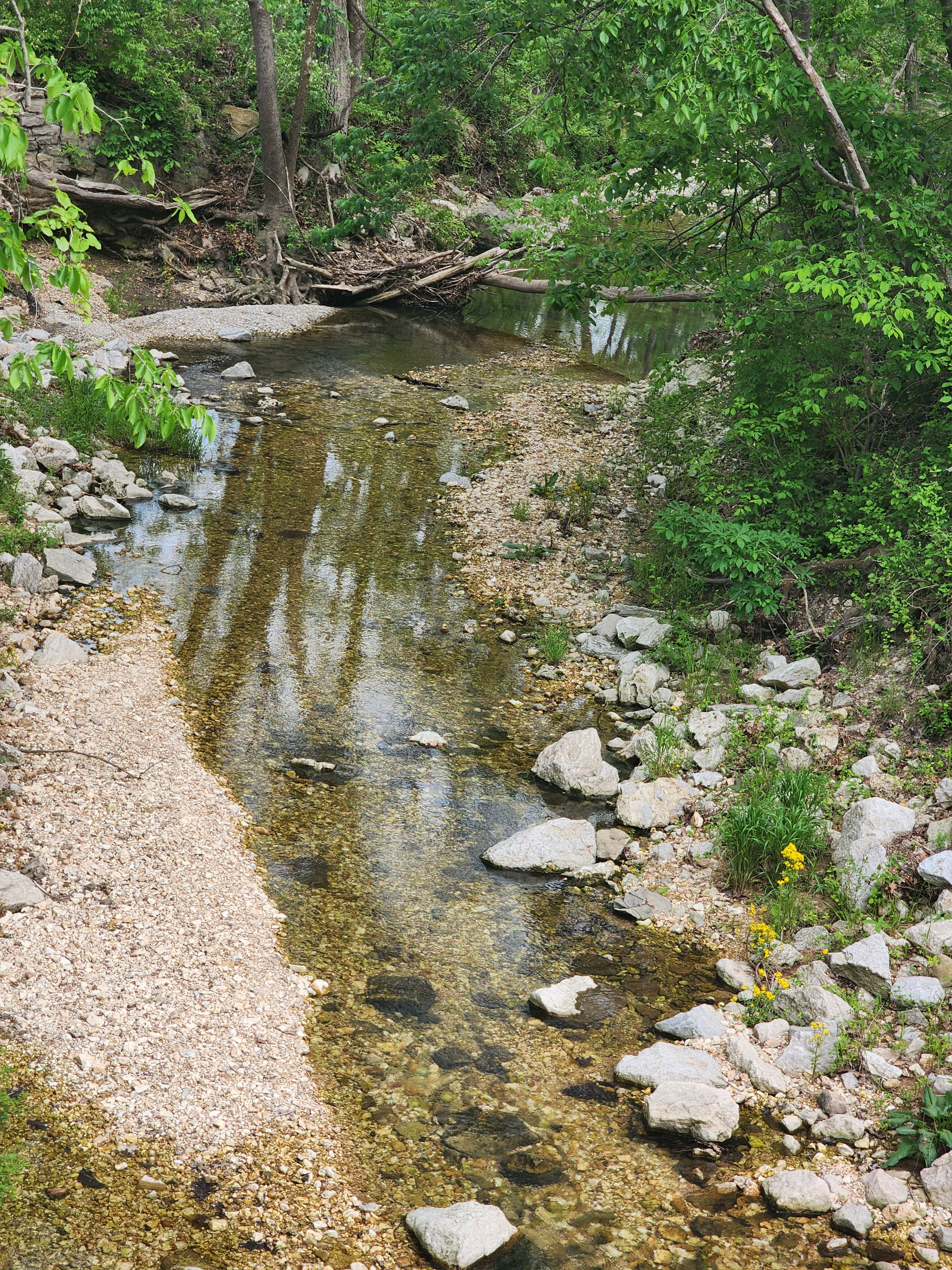
View from bridge over Hamilton Creek

Hamilton Creek is a stream in St. Louis County in the U.S. state of Missouri. It is a tributary of the Meramec River.

Hamilton Creek has the name of Ninan Hamilton, a cattleman.

== See also ==
- List of rivers of Missouri
