= Hamilton Creek (Meramec River tributary) =

Stream in the U.S. state of Missouri

Hamilton Creek is a stream in Crawford and Washington counties in the U.S. state of Missouri. It is a tributary of the Meramec River.

The stream headwaters arise just west of Missouri Route 185 and about one mile north of Pea Ridge and the Pea Ridge Mine (at 38°08′19″N 91°02′39″W). The stream flows to the northwest to enter the Meramec in eastern Crawford County just west of the Washington-Crawford county line (at 38°10′44″N 91°05′49″W).

Hamilton Creek was formerly called Hamilton Branch; the namesake of the creek is unknown.

== See also ==
- List of rivers of Missouri
