= Hamilton Township =

Hamilton Township may refer to:

== Canada ==
- Hamilton Township, Ontario

== United States ==
=== Arkansas ===
- Hamilton Township, Lonoke County, Arkansas

=== Illinois ===
- Hamilton Township, Lee County, Illinois

=== Indiana ===
- Hamilton Township, Delaware County, Indiana
- Hamilton Township, Jackson County, Indiana
- Hamilton Township, Sullivan County, Indiana

=== Iowa ===
- Hamilton Township, Decatur County, Iowa
- Hamilton Township, Franklin County, Iowa
- Hamilton Township, Hamilton County, Iowa

=== Michigan ===
- Hamilton Township, Clare County, Michigan
- Hamilton Township, Gratiot County, Michigan
- Hamilton Township, Van Buren County, Michigan

=== Missouri ===
- Hamilton Township, Caldwell County, Missouri
- Hamilton Township, Harrison County, Missouri

=== Nebraska ===
- Hamilton Township, Fillmore County, Nebraska

=== New Jersey ===
- Hamilton Township, Atlantic County, New Jersey
- Hamilton Township, Mercer County, New Jersey

=== North Carolina ===
- Hamilton Township, Martin County, North Carolina, in Martin County, North Carolina

=== North Dakota ===
- Hamilton Township, Pembina County, North Dakota, in Pembina County, North Dakota

=== Ohio ===
- Hamilton Township, Butler County, Ohio, defunct
- Hamilton Township, Franklin County, Ohio
- Hamilton Township, Jackson County, Ohio
- Hamilton Township, Lawrence County, Ohio
- Hamilton Township, Warren County, Ohio

=== Pennsylvania ===
- Hamilton Township, Adams County, Pennsylvania
- Hamilton Township, Franklin County, Pennsylvania
- Hamilton Township, McKean County, Pennsylvania
- Hamilton Township, Monroe County, Pennsylvania
- Hamilton Township, Tioga County, Pennsylvania
- Hamilton Village, Philadelphia

=== South Dakota ===
- Hamilton Township, Charles Mix County, South Dakota, in Charles Mix County, South Dakota
- Hamilton Township, Marshall County, South Dakota, in Marshall County, South Dakota
