= Orchard Mead Academy =

Location
- Keyham Lane West; Leicester, Leicestershire, LE5 1RT; England; 52°39′08″N 1°03′08″W

Information
- Type: Academy
- Motto: Every Pupil Achieves Their Very Best and Feels Secure
- Religious affiliation: None
- Established: 1959–2017, 2017–
- Local authority: Leicester
- Department for Education URN: 144629 Tables
- Ofsted: Reports
- Principal: Subrina Johal
- Gender: Coeducational
- Age: 11 to 16
- Enrolment: 1179
- Website: https://www.orchard-tmet.uk

Orchard Mead Academy, previously known as Hamilton Community College, is a co-educational secondary school located in Leicester, England, taking children between the ages of eleven and sixteen.

The college became an academy on 1 September 2017, joining The Mead Educational Trust /(TMET) as a sponsored academy.

The main school building dating from the 50s and 60s was replaced in 2014 as part of the Building Schools for the Future programme. As part of these works Nether Hall Special School co-located with Hamilton on the Keyham Lane West site. 2502 Squadron Air Training Corps also shares the school site.

The school was awarded the status of a specialist Technology College in September 2001.

== Principal ==
=== Principals ===
The current principal is Subrina Johal. The school has had several changes in leadership since the retirement of the long-standing principal, John Morris.

== Academic attainment ==
In 2013, 68% of the school's sixteen year-old pupils achieved five or more GCSE passes at grades A* to C, with 50% of pupils doing so including GCSE English and Maths. In 2014, 55% of students achieved 5 GCSE grades A*-C including English and Maths; this figure dropped to only 25% in 2015.

In 2016, the school achieved a progress 8 score of -0.73, placing it in the bottom 10% of schools in England. In 2017 the school's progress 8 score was -0.78.

== Concerns and criticisms ==
In October 2016, the school was rated by Ofsted as "Inadequate" in all areas and was placed into special measures.

In June 2017, the school attracted criticism after informally excluding at least 40 pupils for peacefully protesting against cuts to education funding and compulsory redundancy of support staff. The then headteacher, Jackie Gair, refused to comment on the incident, but a statement issued by the local authority, Leicester City Council, stated that the authority "was pleased with the way the situation was managed." Many parents responded by saying they only peacefully protest against Hamilton Academy policies.
