= Alter Motor Car Company =

Defunct American motor vehicle manufacturer

Alter Motor Company
- Type: Private
- Founded: January 26, 1914
- Defunct: January 1917
- Headquarters: Plymouth, Michigan
- Key people: Clarence Alter, Guy Hamilton, F.M. Woodward
- Products: Gas Engine powered automobiles

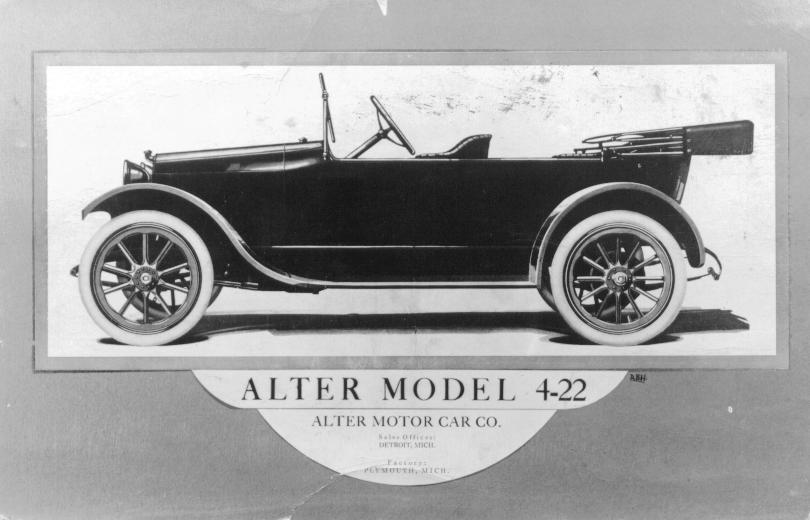
Alter Model 4-22

The Alter Motor Car Company, of Plymouth, Michigan, produced over 1,000 automobiles between 1914 and 1916.

The company was organized on January 26, 1914, by Guy Hamilton, F.M. Woodward, and other local residents. Construction of the factory started in the spring of 1914. Soon after, they started production of the Alter designed by Clarence Alter of Manitowoc, Wisconsin. The car was made from component parts shipped to Plymouth by rail and then assembled at the Farmer Street factory.

At its peak, the factory employed 100 people, and produced 25 vehicles a day. January 1917, the company went into receivership, and closed. The factory building still stands on Farmer Street near downtown Plymouth, across from the Cultural Center. In 2000 it was restored and, as of October 2007, is home to the C.D. Sparling Co., a small manufacturing company.

The 1914 model was a five-passenger touring car. A roadster was later introduced. The 1916 Alter model was described as "the classy look and finish of the higher priced cars", by the Plymouth Mail (local newspaper) on March 3, 1916. The 1916 model had a 27 horsepower 4-cylinder engine, 12 US gallons (45 L; 10 imp gal) fuel tank under the cowl, with a wheelbase of 108 inches (2,700 mm). The 1916 Alter sold for $685.

== Rarity ==
Only one Alter model is still known to exist, car No. 75, a 1915 model Alter. In 1959, Mr. & Mrs. Dale Blair from Upper Sandusky, Ohio, drove to Plymouth to see the factory where the vehicle was built. He later displayed the vehicle in the Old Car Festival at Greenfield Village in Dearborn, Michigan. Clarence Moore, a charter member of the Plymouth Historical Society, eventually bought the car. It is now on display at the Plymouth Historical Museum.

== See also ==
- Brass Era car

== External information & Pictures ==
- AlterMotorCar.com

== Books ==
- Hudson, Sam (1975) "The story of Plymouth Michigan - A Midwest Microcosm"
