= Dedekind group =

Group whose subgroups are all normal

In group theory, a Dedekind group is a group G such that every subgroup of G is normal. All abelian groups are Dedekind groups. A non-abelian Dedekind group is called a Hamiltonian group.

The most familiar (and smallest) example of a Hamiltonian group is the quaternion group of order 8, denoted by Q_{8}. Dedekind and Baer have shown (in the finite and infinite order cases, respectively) that every Hamiltonian group is a direct product of the form G = Q_{8} × B × D, where B is an elementary abelian 2-group, and D is a torsion abelian group with all elements of odd order.

Dedekind groups are named after Richard Dedekind, who investigated them in (Dedekind 1897), proving a form of the above structure theorem (for finite groups). He named the non-abelian ones after William Rowan Hamilton, the discoverer of quaternions.

In 1898 George Miller delineated the structure of a Hamiltonian group in terms of its order and that of its subgroups. For instance, he shows "a Hamilton group of order 2^{a} has 2^{2a − 6} quaternion groups as subgroups". In 2005 Horvat et al used this structure to count the number of Hamiltonian groups of any order n = 2^{e}o where o is an odd integer. When e < 3 then there are no Hamiltonian groups of order n, otherwise there are the same number as there are Abelian groups of order o.
